This is a list of notable individuals and organizations who endorsed Joe Biden's campaign for President of the United States in the 2020 U.S. presidential election.

Former federal executive officials

Presidents

Jimmy Carter, 39th president of the United States (1977–1981), Governor of Georgia (1971–1975), Georgia State Senator from District 14 (1963–1967), recipient of the Nobel Peace Prize in 2002
Bill Clinton, 42nd president of the United States (1993–2001), Governor of Arkansas (1979–1981, 1983–1992), Attorney General of Arkansas (1977–1979)
Barack Obama, 44th president of the United States  (2009–2017) – under whom Biden served as vice president, U.S. Senator from Illinois (2005–2008), Illinois State Senator from District 13 (1997–2004), recipient of the Nobel Peace Prize in 2009

Vice Presidents

Al Gore, 45th Vice President of the United States (1993–2001), U.S. Senator from Tennessee (1985–1993), U.S. Representative from TN-06 (1983–1985) and TN-04 (1977–1983), 2000 nominee for president, recipient of the Nobel Peace Prize in 2007
Walter Mondale, 42nd Vice President of the United States (1977–1981), U.S. Ambassador to Japan (1993–1996), U.S. Senator from Minnesota (1964–1976), Attorney General of Minnesota (1960–1964), 1984 nominee for president

Cabinet-level officials

Madeleine Albright, U.S. Secretary of State (1997–2001), U.S. Ambassador to the United Nations (1993–1997)
Peter Allgeier, U.S. Trade Representative (2005, 2009) (Republican)
Rand Beers, U.S. Secretary of Homeland Security (2013), U.S. Deputy Secretary of Homeland Security (2013), Under Secretary of Homeland Security for National Protection and Programs (2009–2014)
Erskine Bowles, president of the University of North Carolina System (2005–2010), Administrator of the Small Business Administration (1993–1994), White House Chief of Staff (1997–1998), White House Deputy Chief of Staff for Operations (1994–1996)
Carol Browner, Administrator of the Environmental Protection Agency (1993–2001), director of the White House Office of Energy and Climate Change Policy (2009–2011)
William J. Burns, U.S. Secretary of State (2009)
Ash Carter, U.S. Secretary of Defense (2015–2017)
Julian Castro, U.S. Secretary of Housing and Urban Development (2014–2017), Mayor of San Antonio, Texas (2009–2014), 2020 candidate for president
Henry Cisneros, U.S. Secretary of Housing and Urban Development (1993–1997), Mayor of San Antonio, TX (1981–1989)
James Clapper, Director of National Intelligence (2010–2017), Under Secretary of Defense for Intelligence (2007–2010), director of the National Geospatial-Intelligence Agency (2001–2006), Director of the Defense Intelligence Agency (1991–1995)
Hillary Clinton, U.S. Secretary of State (2009–2013), U.S. Senator from New York (2001–2009), First Lady of the United States (1993–2001), 2016 nominee for president
Steven Chu, U.S. Secretary of Energy (2009–2013), Laureate of the Nobel Prize in Physics (1997)
William Cohen, U.S. Secretary of Defense (1997–2001), U.S. Senator from Maine (1979–1997), U.S. Representative from ME-02 (1973–1979) (Republican)
Maria Contreras-Sweet, administrator of the Small Business Administration (2014–2017), California Secretary of Business, Transportation and Housing Agency (1999–2003)
James B. Cunningham, U.S. Ambassador to the United Nations (2001), U.S. Ambassador to Afghanistan (2012–2014), U.S. Ambassador to Israel (2008–2011)
William M. Daley, U.S. Secretary of Commerce (1997–2000), White House Chief of Staff (2011–2012)
Tom Donilon, U.S. National Security Advisor (2010–2013), Deputy National Security Advisor (2009–2010)
Rahm Emanuel, Mayor of Chicago, Illinois (2011–2019), White House Chief of Staff (2009–2010), U.S. Representative from IL-05 (2003–2009), Senior Advisor to the President (1993–1998)
Mike Espy, U.S. Secretary of Agriculture (1993–1994), 2020 nominee for Senate, U.S. Representative from MS-02 (1987–1993)
Anthony Foxx, U.S. Secretary of Transportation (2013–2017), Mayor of Charlotte, North Carolina (2009–2013)
Michael Froman, U.S. Trade Representative (2013–2017)
Stuart M. Gerson, U.S. Attorney General (1993) (Republican)
Dan Glickman, U.S. Secretary of Agriculture (1995–2001), U.S. Representative from KS-04 (1977–1995)
Carlos Gutierrez, U.S. Secretary of Commerce (2005–2009) (Republican)
Chuck Hagel, U.S. Secretary of Defense (2013–2015), U.S. Senator from Nebraska (1997–2009) (Republican)
Michael Hayden, Director of the Central Intelligence Agency (2006–2009), Director of the National Security Agency (1999–2005) (Independent)
Carla Anderson Hills, U.S. Secretary of Housing and Urban Development (1975–1977), U.S. Trade Representative (1989–1993) (Republican)
Eric Holder, U.S. Attorney General (2009–2015), U.S. Deputy Attorney General (1997–2001), U.S. Attorney for the District of Columbia (1993–1997)
Sally Jewell, U.S. Secretary of the Interior (2013–2017)
Mickey Kantor, U.S. Secretary of Commerce (1996–1997), U.S. Trade Representative (1993–1996)
Peter Keisler, U.S. Attorney General (2007) (Republican)
John Kerry, U.S. Special Presidential Envoy for Climate (2021–present), U.S. Secretary of State (2013–2017), U.S. Senator from Massachusetts (1985–2013), Lieutenant Governor of Massachusetts (1983–1985), 2004 nominee for president
Ray LaHood, U.S. Secretary of Transportation (2009–2013), U.S. Representative from IL-18 (1995–2009) (Republican)
Jack Lew, U.S. Secretary of the Treasury (2013–2017), White House Chief of Staff (2012–2013), Director of the Office of Management and Budget (2010–2012, 1998–2001)
Gary Locke, U.S. Ambassador to China (2011–2014), U.S. Secretary of Commerce (2009–2011), Governor of Washington (1997–2005)
James Loy, U.S. Secretary of Homeland Security (2005)
Gina McCarthy, administrator of the Environmental Protection Agency (2013–2017)
Bob McDonald, U.S. Secretary of Veterans Affairs (2014–2017) (Republican)
Denis McDonough, U.S. Secretary of Veterans Affairs (2021–present), White House Chief of Staff (2013–2017), Deputy National Security Advisor (2010–2013)
Donald McHenry, U.S. Ambassador to the United Nations (1979–1981)
Norman Mineta, U.S. Secretary of Transportation (2001–2006), U.S. Secretary of Commerce (2000–2001), U.S. Representative from CA-15 (1993–1995) and CA-13 (1975–1993)
Janet Napolitano, president of the University of California System (2013–present), U.S. Secretary of Homeland Security (2009–2013), Governor of Arizona (2003–2009), chair of the National Governors Association (2006–2007)
John Negroponte, U.S. Deputy Secretary of State (2007–2009), Director of National Intelligence (2005–2007), U.S. Ambassador to Iraq (2004–2005), U.S. Ambassador to the United Nations (2001–2004), U.S. Ambassador to the Philippines (1993–1996), U.S. Ambassador to Mexico (1989–1993), Deputy National Security Advisor (1987–1989), Assistant Secretary of State for Oceans and International Environmental and Scientific Affairs (1985–1987), U.S. Ambassador to Honduras (1981–1985) (Republican)
Leon Panetta, U.S. Secretary of Defense (2011–2013), director of the Central Intelligence Agency (2009–2011), White House Chief of Staff (1994–1997), director of the Office of Management and Budget (1993–1994), U.S. Representative from CA-16 (1977–1993)
Anne W. Patterson, Assistant Secretary of State for Near Eastern Affairs (2013–2017), U.S. Ambassador to Egypt (2011–2013), U.S. Ambassador to Pakistan (2007–2010), U.S. Ambassador to the United Nations (2005), Assistant Secretary of State for International Narcotics and Law Enforcement Affairs (2005–2007), U.S. Ambassador to Colombia (2000–2003), U.S. Ambassador to El Salvador (1997–2000)
Kal Penn, former Principal Associate Director of the White House Office of Public Engagement (2009–2011) and actor
Federico Peña, U.S. Secretary of Energy (1997–1998), U.S. Secretary of Transportation (1993–1997), Mayor of Denver, Colorado (1983–1991)
William Perry, U.S. Secretary of Defense (1994–1997), U.S. Deputy Secretary of Defense (1993–1994), Under Secretary of Defense for Research and Engineering
Mary E. Peters, U.S. Secretary of Transportation (2006–2009) (Republican)
Thomas R. Pickering, U.S. Ambassador to the United Nations (1989–1992)
John Podesta, White House Chief of Staff (1998–2001)
Colin Powell, U.S. Secretary of State (2001–2005), Chairman of the Joint Chiefs of Staff (1989–1993), U.S. National Security Advisor (1987–1989) (Republican)
Samantha Power, U.S. Ambassador to the United Nations (2013–2017)
Penny Pritzker, U.S. Secretary of Commerce (2013–2017)
Robert Reich, U.S. Secretary of Labor (1993–1997)
William K. Reilly, administrator of the Environmental Protection Agency (1989–1993) (Republican)
Susan Rice, Director of the United States Domestic Policy Council (2021–present), U.S. National Security Advisor (2013–2017), U.S. Ambassador to the United Nations (2009–2013), Assistant Secretary of State for African Affairs (1997–2001)
Bill Richardson, Governor of New Mexico (2003–2011), U.S. Secretary of Energy (1998–2001), U.S. Ambassador to the United Nations (1997–1998), U.S. Representative from NM-03 (1983–1997)
Tom Ridge, U.S. Secretary of Homeland Security (2003–2005) U.S. Homeland Security Advisor (2001–2003) Governor of Pennsylvania (1995–2001) U.S. Representative from PA-21 (1983–1995) (Republican)
Richard Riley, U.S. Secretary of Education (1993–2001), Governor of South Carolina (1979–1987)
Robert Rubin, director of the U.S. National Economic Council (1993–1995), U.S. Secretary of the Treasury (1995–1999), chairman of the Council on Foreign Relations (2007–2017)
Ken Salazar, U.S. Secretary of the Interior (2009–2013), U.S. Senator from Colorado (2005–2009)
Miriam Sapiro, U.S. Trade Representative (2013), Deputy U.S. Trade Representative (2009–2014)
Kathleen Sebelius, U.S. Secretary of Health and Human Services (2009–2014), Governor of Kansas (2003–2009)
Thomas A. Shannon Jr., U.S. Secretary of State (2017) (Republican)
Hilda Solis, U.S. Secretary of Labor (2009–2013), U.S. Representative from CA-32 (2001–2009)
Lawrence Summers, Director of the National Economic Council (2009–2011), President of Harvard University (2001–2006), U.S. Secretary of the Treasury (1999–2001)
Ann Veneman, U.S. Secretary of Agriculture (2001–2005) (Republican)
Tom Vilsack, U.S. Secretary of Agriculture (2009–2017, 2021–present), Governor of Iowa (1999–2007)
Jack Watson, White House Chief of Staff (1980–1981)
William H. Webster, chair of the Homeland Security Advisory Council (2005–2020), Director of Central Intelligence (1987–1991), Director of the Federal Bureau of Investigation (1978–1987), judge of the U.S. Court of Appeals for the Eighth Circuit (1973–1978), judge of the U.S. District Court for the Eastern District of Missouri (1970–1973), U.S. Attorney for the Eastern District of Missouri (1960–1961) (Republican)
Christine Todd Whitman, administrator of the Environmental Protection Agency (2001–2003) Governor of New Jersey (1994–2001) (Republican)
Neal S. Wolin, U.S. Deputy Secretary of the Treasury (2009–2013), U.S. Secretary of the Treasury (2013), chair of the Intelligence Oversight Board (2015–2017)
Sally Yates, U.S. Attorney General (2017), U.S. Deputy Attorney General (2015–2017), U.S. Attorney for the Northern District of Georgia (2010–2015)
Janet Yellen, U.S. Secretary of the Treasury (2021–present), Chair of the Federal Reserve (2014–2018), vice chair of the Federal Reserve (2010–2014), member of the Federal Reserve Board of Governors (2010–2018, 1994–1997), president of the Federal Reserve Bank of San Francisco (2004–2010), chair of the Council of Economic Advisers (1997–1999)
Andrew Young, Mayor of Atlanta, Georgia (1982–1990), U.S. Ambassador to the United Nations (1977–1979), U.S. Representative from GA-05 (1973–1977)
Jeffrey Zients, Chief Performance Officer of the United States (2009–2013), director of the Office of Management and Budget (2010, 2012–2013), director of the National Economic Council (2014–2017)
Robert Zoellick, U.S. Trade Representative (2001–2005) (Republican)

State Department officials

Hady Amr, U.S. Deputy Special Envoy for Israeli-Palestinian Negotiations (2014–2017)
Richard Armitage, U.S. Deputy Secretary of State (2001–2005) (Republican)
Elizabeth Frawley Bagley, special advisor for Secretary's Initiatives (2010–2013, 2014–2017), special representative for Global Partnerships (2009–2010), U.S. Ambassador to Portugal (1994–1997)
John B. Bellinger III, Legal Adviser of the Department of State (2005–2009) (Republican)
Virginia L. Bennett, Assistant Secretary of State for Democracy, Human Rights, and Labor (2017)
Nisha Biswal, Assistant Secretary of State for South and Central Asian Affairs (2014–2017)
Robert O. Blake Jr., U.S. Ambassador to Indonesia (2014–2016), Assistant Secretary of State for South and Central Asian Affairs (2009–2013)
Tony Blinken, U.S. Deputy Secretary of State (2015–2017), Deputy National Security Advisor (2013–2015)
Richard Boucher, Assistant Secretary of State for South and Central Asian Affairs (2006–2009) (Republican)
Reuben Brigety, Deputy Assistant Secretary of State for African Affairs (2011–2013)
R. Nicholas Burns, Under Secretary of State for Political Affairs (2005–2008)
Kurt M. Campbell, Assistant Secretary of State for East Asian and Pacific Affairs (2009–2013)
Richard A. Clarke, Assistant Secretary of State for Political-Military Affairs (1989–1992)
Eliot A. Cohen, Counselor of the U.S. Department of State (2007–2009) (Republican)
Elinor Constable, Assistant Secretary of State for Oceans and International Environmental and Scientific Affairs (1993–1995), U.S. Ambassador to Kenya (1986–1989)
Chester Crocker, Assistant Secretary of State for African Affairs (1981–1989) (Republican)
Evan Dobelle, Chief of Protocol (1977–1978)
William A. Eaton, U.S. Ambassador to Panama (2005–2008), Assistant Secretary of State for Administration (2001–2005)
Eric S. Edelman, Under Secretary of Defense for Policy (2005–2009), U.S. Ambassador to Turkey (2003–2005), U.S. Ambassador to Finland (1998–2001) (Republican)
Stuart E. Eizenstat, U.S. Under Secretary of State for Economic Growth, Energy, and the Environment (1997–1999), U.S. Ambassador to the European Union (1993–1996)
Jeffrey D. Feltman, Assistant Secretary of State for Near Eastern Affairs (2009–2012), U.S. Ambassador to Lebanon (2004–2008)
Jose W. Fernandez, Assistant Secretary of State for Economic and Business Affairs (2009–2013)
Jonathan Finer, Director of Policy Planning (2016–2017)
Carl W. Ford Jr., Assistant Secretary of State for Intelligence and Research (2001–2003) (Republican)
Ira Forman, Special Envoy for Monitoring and Combating Anti-Semitism (2013–2017)
Douglas Frantz, Assistant Secretary of State for Public Affairs (2013–2015)
Robert S. Gelbard, U.S. Ambassador to Indonesia (1999–2001), Assistant Secretary of State for International Narcotics Matters (1993–1997), U.S. Ambassador to Bolivia (1988–1991)
James K. Glassman, Under Secretary of State for Public Diplomacy and Public Affairs (2008–2009) (Republican)
L. Felice Gorordo, Bureau of Western Hemisphere Affairs (2006–2007)
Rose Gottemoeller, Assistant Secretary of State for Arms Control, Verification, and Compliance (2009–2014), Under Secretary of State for Arms Control and International Security Affairs (2012–2016)
Colleen Graffy, Deputy Assistant Secretary of State for Public Diplomacy in Europe and Eurasia (2004–2009) (Republican)
Heather Higginbottom, Deputy Secretary of State for Management and Resources (2013–2017), Counselor of the United States Department of State (2013), deputy director of the Office of Management and Budget (2011–2013)
Christopher R. Hill, Assistant Secretary of State for East Asian and Pacific Affairs (2005–2009), U.S. Ambassador to Iraq (2009–2010), U.S. Ambassador to South Korea (2004–2005), U.S. Ambassador to Poland (2000–2004), U.S. Ambassador to Macedonia (1996–1999), U.S. Ambassador to Albania (1991)
Karl Inderfurth, Assistant Secretary of State for South and Central Asian Affairs (1997–2001)
Roberta S. Jacobson, Assistant Secretary of State for Western Hemisphere Affairs (2011–2016), U.S. Ambassador to Mexico (2016–2018)
Tracey Ann Jacobson, Assistant Secretary of State for International Organization Affairs (2017), U.S. Ambassador to Kosovo (2012–2015), U.S. Ambassador to Tajikistan (2006–2009)
James A. Kelly, Assistant Secretary of State for East Asian and Pacific Affairs (2001–2005) (Republican)
Kristie Kenney, Counselor of the United States Department of State (2016–2017)
Harold Hongju Koh, Legal Adviser of the Department of State (2009–2013), Assistant Secretary of State for Democracy, Human Rights, and Labor (1998–2001)
David J. Kramer, Assistant Secretary of State for Democracy, Human Rights, and Labor (2008–2009) (Republican)
Stephen D. Krasner, director of policy planning (2005–2007) (Republican)
Barbara Larkin, Assistant Secretary of State for Legislative Affairs (1996–2001)
Reta Jo Lewis, special representative for global intergovernmental affairs at the Department of State
John Limbert, Deputy Assistant Secretary of State for Iran (2009–2010), U.S. Ambassador to Mauritania (2000–2003)
David Lyle Mack, Deputy Assistant Secretary of State for Near East Affairs (1990–1993), U.S. Ambassador to the United Arab Emirates (1986–1989)
Nancy McEldowney, director of the Foreign Service Institute (2013–2017), U.S. Ambassador to Bulgaria (2008–2009)
Thomas O. Melia, Assistant Administrator of USAID for Europe and Eurasia (2015–2017)
Alberto J. Mora, general counsel to the U.S. Information Agency (1989–1993) (Republican)
Thomas R. Nides, Deputy Secretary of State for Management and Resources (2011–2013)
Suzanne Nossel, Deputy Assistant Secretary of State for International Organization Affairs (2009)
Victoria Nuland, Assistant Secretary of State for European and Eurasian Affairs (2013–2017), Spokesperson for the United States Department of State (2011–2013), U.S. Ambassador to NATO (2005–2008)
Douglas H. Paal, former member of the U.S. State Department Policy Planning Staff (Republican)
Michael C. Polt, U.S. Ambassador to Estonia (2009–2012), U.S. Ambassador to Serbia (2006–2007), U.S. Ambassador to Serbia and Montenegro (2004–2006), Assistant Secretary of State for Legislative Affairs (2001)
Robin Raphel, U.S. Ambassador to Tunisia (1997–2001), Assistant Secretary of State for South and Central Asian Affairs (1993–1997)
Joel Martin Rubin, Deputy Assistant Secretary of State for Legislative Affairs (2014–2017)
Evan Ryan, Assistant Secretary of State for Educational and Cultural Affairs (2013–2017)
Kori Schake, deputy director for Policy Planning for the U.S. Department of State (2007–2008) (Republican)
Peter A. Selfridge, Chief of Protocol of the United States (2014–2017)
Elaine Schuster, public delegate to the United Nations General Assembly (2009–2010)
Wendy Sherman, U.S. Deputy Secretary of State (2014–2015)
Jay T. Snyder, Commissioner of the U.S. Advisory Commission on Public Diplomacy
James Steinberg, U.S. Deputy Secretary of State (2009–2011), Deputy National Security Advisor (1996–2000)
Linda Thomas-Greenfield, Assistant Secretary of State for African Affairs (2013–2017), Director General of the Foreign Service (2012–2013), U.S. Ambassador to Liberia (2008–2012)
Arturo Valenzuela, Assistant Secretary of State for Western Hemisphere Affairs (2009–2011)
Nicholas A. Veliotes, Assistant Secretary of State for Near Eastern and South Asian Affairs (1981–1983), U.S. Ambassador to Egypt (1984–1986), U.S. Ambassador to Jordan (1978–1981)
Richard Verma, Assistant Secretary of State for Legislative Affairs (2009–2011), U.S. Ambassador to India (2015–2017)
Edward S. Walker Jr., Assistant Secretary of State for Near Eastern Affairs (2000–2001), U.S. Ambassador to Israel (1997–2000), U.S. Ambassador to Egypt (1994–1997), U.S. Ambassador to the United Arab Emirates (1989–1992)
Earl Anthony Wayne, Assistant Secretary of State for Economic and Business Affairs (2000–2006), U.S. Ambassador to Argentina (2007–2009), U.S. Ambassador to Mexico (2011–2015)
Frank G. Wisner, U.S. Ambassador to Zambia (1979–1982), U.S. Ambassador to Egypt (1986–1991), U.S. Ambassador to the Philippines (1991–1992), Under Secretary of State for International Security Affairs (1992–1993), Under Secretary of Defense for Policy (1993–1994), U.S. Ambassador to India (1994–1997)
John Wolf, Assistant Secretary of State for International Organization Affairs (1989–1992), U.S. Ambassador to Malaysia (1992–1995) (Republican)
Philip D. Zelikow, counselor of the U.S. Department of State (2005–2007) (Republican)
Peter Zimmerman, former chief scientist of the U.S. Senate Committee on Foreign Relations and Science Adviser for Arms Control

U.S. Ambassadors

 

Gina Abercrombie-Winstanley, U.S. Ambassador to Malta (2012–2016)
Charles C. Adams Jr., U.S. Ambassador to Finland (2015–2017)
Leslie M. Alexander, U.S. Ambassador to Ecuador (1996–1999), U.S. Ambassador to Mauritius, U.S. Ambassador to Comoros (1994–1996), U.S. Ambassador to Haiti (1992–1993)
Mari Carmen Aponte, U.S. Ambassador to El Salvador (2012–2015)
Nicole Avant, U.S. Ambassador to the Bahamas (2009–2011)
Robert C. Barber, U.S. Ambassador to Iceland (2015–2017)
Robert L. Barry, U.S. Ambassador to Indonesia (1992–1995), U.S. Ambassador to Bulgaria (1981–1984)
Matthew Barzun, U.S. Ambassador to the United Kingdom (2013–2017), U.S. Ambassador to Sweden (2009–2011)
Leslie A. Bassett, U.S. Ambassador to Paraguay (2015–2017)
Michael A. Battle Sr., U.S. Ambassador to the African Union (2009–2013)
Max Baucus, U.S. Senator from Montana (1978–2014), U.S. Ambassador to China (2014–2017), U.S. Representative from MT-01 (1975–1978)
Denise Bauer, U.S. Ambassador to Belgium (2013–2017)
Colleen Bell, U.S. Ambassador to Hungary (2015–2017)
Jack R. Binns, U.S. Ambassador to Honduras (1980–1981)
Robert Blackwill, U.S. Ambassador to India (2001–2003) (Republican)
James Blanchard, U.S. Ambassador to Canada (1993–1996), Governor of Michigan (1983–1991), U.S. Representative from MI-18 (1975–1983)
John W. Blaney, U.S. Ambassador to Liberia (2002–2005)
Jeff Bleich, U.S. Ambassador to Australia (2009–2013)
Alan Blinken, U.S. Ambassador to Belgium (1993–1997)
Barbara Bodine, U.S. Ambassador to Yemen (1997–2001)
Avis Bohlen, U.S. Ambassador to Bulgaria (1996–1999)
Amy L. Bondurant, U.S. Ambassador to the Organization for Cooperation and Development (1997–2001)
Charles R. Bowers, U.S. Ambassador to Bolivia (1991–1994) (Republican)
Carol Moseley Braun, U.S. Senator from Illinois (1993–1999), U.S. Ambassador to New Zealand and Samoa (1999–2001)
Aurelia E. Brazeal, U.S. Ambassador to Ethiopia (2002–2005), U.S. Ambassador to Kenya (1993–1996), U.S. Ambassador to Micronesia (1990–1993)
Wally Brewster, U.S. Ambassador to the Dominican Republic (2013–2017)
Peter Bridges, U.S. Ambassador to Somalia (1984–1986) (Republican)
Reuben Brigety, U.S. Ambassador to the African Union (2013–2015), Dean of the Elliott School of International Affairs (2015–present)
Tim Broas, U.S. Ambassador to the Netherlands (2014–2016)
Sue K. Brown, U.S. Ambassador to Montenegro (2011–2015)
George Charles Bruno, U.S. Ambassador to Belize (1994–1997)
Mark Brzezinski, U.S. Ambassador to Sweden (2011–2015)
Richard Burt, U.S. Ambassador to Germany (1985–1989) (Republican)
Dwight L. Bush Sr., U.S. Ambassador to Morocco (2014–2017)
Prudence Bushnell, U.S. Ambassador to Guatemala (1999–2002), U.S. Ambassador to Kenya (1996–1999)
Judith Beth Cefkin, U.S. Ambassador to Fiji (2015–2018), U.S. Ambassador to Kiribati (2015–2018), U.S. Ambassador to Nauru (2015–2018), U.S. Ambassador to Tonga (2015–2018), U.S. Ambassador to Tuvalu (2015–2018)
Dick Celeste, Governor of Ohio (1983–1991), U.S. Ambassador to India (1997–2001), director of the Peace Corps (1979–1981), Lieutenant Governor of Ohio (1975–1979)
Peter R. Chaveas, U.S. Ambassador to Sierra Leone (2001–2004), U.S. Ambassador to Malawi (1994–1997)
Mark B. Childress, U.S. Ambassador to Tanzania (2014–2016)
Jack Chow, former special representative of the U.S. Secretary of State on Global HIV/AIDS (Republican)
Isobel Coleman, U.S. Ambassador to the United Nations for Management and Reform (2014–2017)
Maura Connelly, U.S. Ambassador to Syria (2008–2010), U.S. Ambassador to Lebanon (2010–2013)
Elinor G. Constable, U.S. Ambassador to Kenya (1986–1989)
Frances D. Cook, U.S. Ambassador to Burundi (1980–1983), U.S. Ambassador to Cameroon (1989–1993), U.S. Ambassador to Oman (1996–1999)
Suzan Johnson Cook, U.S. Ambassador-at-Large for International Religious Freedom (2011–2013)
Jerome G. Cooper, U.S. Ambassador to Jamaica (1994–1997)
James Costos, U.S. Ambassador to Spain and Andorra (2013–2017)
Cindy Courville, U.S. Ambassador to the African Union (2006–2008)
Ryan Crocker, U.S. Ambassador to Afghanistan (2002, 2011–2012), U.S. Ambassador to Iraq (2007–2009), U.S. Ambassador to Pakistan (2004–2007), U.S. Ambassador to Syria (1999–2001), U.S. Ambassador to Kuwait (1994–1997), U.S. Ambassador to Lebanon (1990–1993)
Ruth A. Davis, U.S. Ambassador to Benin (1992–1995)
Jeffrey DeLaurentis, U.S. Ambassador to Cuba (2014–2017), U.S. Ambassador to the United Nations for Special Political Affairs (2011–2014)
Greg Delawie, U.S. Ambassador to Kosovo (2015–2018)
Robert Sherwood Dillon, U.S. Ambassador to Lebanon (1981–1983)
Kathleen A. Doherty, U.S. Ambassador to Cyprus (2015–2018)
William Eacho, U.S. Ambassador to Austria (2009–2013)
Stuart Eizenstat, director of the White House Domestic Policy Council (1977–1981), U.S. Deputy Secretary of the Treasury (1999–2001), U.S. Ambassador to the European Union (1993–1996)
Susan M. Elliott, U.S. Ambassador to Tajikistan (2012–2015)
John B. Emerson, U.S. Ambassador to Germany (2013–2017)
John L. Estrada, U.S. Ambassador to Trinidad and Tobago (2016–2017)
Gerald Feierstein, U.S. Ambassador to Yemen (2010–2013)
Judith Fergin, U.S. Ambassador to East Timor (2010–2013)
Julie Finley, U.S. Ambassador to the Organization for Security and Cooperation in Europe (2005–2009) (Republican)
Robert Stephen Ford, U.S. Ambassador to Syria (2011–2014), U.S. Ambassador to Algeria (2006–2008)
Elizabeth Frawley Bagley, U.S. Ambassador to Portugal (1994–1997)
Laurie S. Fulton, U.S. Ambassador to Denmark (2009–2013)
Julie Furuta-Toy, U.S. Ambassador to Equatorial Guinea (2016–2019)
Edward M. Gabriel, U.S. Ambassador to Morocco (1997–2001)
Peter Galbraith, U.S. Ambassador to Croatia (1993–1998)
Anthony L. Gardner, U.S. Ambassador to the European Union (2014–2017)
Gordon Giffin, U.S. Ambassador to Canada (1997–2001)
Rufus Gifford, U.S. Ambassador to Denmark (2013–2017)
Mark Gilbert, U.S. Ambassador to New Zealand (2015–2017)
Marc Ginsberg, U.S. Ambassador to Morocco (1994–1998)
Mark Gitenstein, U.S. Ambassador to Romania (2009–2012)
Edward Gnehm, U.S. Ambassador to Jordan (2001–2014), U.S. Ambassador to Australia (2000–2001), U.S. Ambassador to Kuwait (1991–1994)
Christopher E. Goldthwait, U.S. Ambassador to Chad (1999–2004)
Gary A. Grappo U.S. Ambassador to Oman (2006–2009)
Gordon Gray III, U.S. Ambassador to Tunisia (2009–2012)
Gabriel Guerra-Mondragón, U.S. Ambassador to Chile (1994–1998)
Lino Gutierrez, U.S. Ambassador to Argentina (2003–2006), U.S. Ambassador to Nicaragua (1996–1999)
Howard Gutman, U.S. Ambassador to Belgium (2009–2013)
Nina Hachigian, U.S. Ambassador to the Association of Southeast Asian Nations (2014–2017)
Tony P. Hall, U.S. Ambassador to the United Nations Agencies for Food and Agriculture (2002–2006)
Pamela Hamamoto, U.S. Ambassador to the United Nations International Organizations in Geneva (2014–2017)
S. Fitzgerald Haney, U.S. Ambassador to Costa Rica (2015–2017)
Anthony Stephen Harrington, U.S. Ambassador to Brazil (1999–2001)
Jane D. Hartley, U.S. Ambassador to France (2014–2017), U.S. Ambassador to Monaco (2014–2017)
Bruce Heyman, U.S. Ambassador to Canada (2014–2017)
Karl W. Hofmann, U.S. Ambassador to Togo (2000–2002)
Laura Holgate, U.S. Ambassador to the United Nations International Organizations in Vienna (2016–2017)
Thomas C. Hubbard, U.S. Ambassador to South Korea (2001–2004), U.S. Ambassador to the Philippines (1996–2000)
Vicki J. Huddleston, U.S. Ambassador to Mali (2000–2005), U.S. Ambassador to Madagascar (1995–1996)
David Huebner, U.S. Ambassador to New Zealand and Samoa (2010–2014)
Edmund Hull, U.S. Ambassador to Yemen (2001–2004)
David T. Johnson, U.S. Ambassador to the Organization for Security and Co-operation in Europe (1998–2001)
A. Elizabeth Jones, U.S. Ambassador to Kazakhstan (1995–1997)
Deborah K. Jones, U.S. Ambassador to Libya (2013–2015), U.S. Ambassador to Kuwait (2008–2011)
Samuel L. Kaplan, U.S. Ambassador to Morocco (2009–2013)
Theodore H. Kattouf, U.S. Ambassador to the United Arab Emirates (1999–2001), U.S. Ambassador to Syria (2001–2003)
Richard Kauzlarich, U.S. Ambassador to Bosnia and Herzegovina (1997–1999), U.S. Ambassador to Azerbaijan (1994–1997)
Caroline Kennedy, U.S. Ambassador to Japan (2013–2017)
Laura E. Kennedy, U.S. Ambassador to Turkmenistan (2001–2003)
Kristie Kenney, U.S. Ambassador to Thailand (2011–2014), U.S. Ambassador to the Philippines (2006–2009), U.S. Ambassador to Ecuador (2002–2005)
Jimmy J. Kolker, U.S. Ambassador to Uganda (2002–2005), U.S. Ambassador to Burkina Faso (1999–2002)
Karen Kornbluh, U.S. Ambassador to the Organisation for Economic Co-operation and Development (2009–2012)
Thomas C. Krajeski, U.S. Ambassador to Yemen (2004–2007), U.S. Ambassador to Bahrain (2011–2014)
Lisa Kubiske. U.S. Ambassador to Honduras (2011–2014)
Madeleine Kunin, Governor of Vermont (1985–1991), U.S. Ambassador to Liechtenstein (1997–1999), U.S. Ambassador to Switzerland (1996–1999), U.S. Deputy Secretary of Education (1993–1996), Lieutenant Governor of Vermont (1979–1983)
Mark P. Lagon, U.S. Ambassador-at-Large to Monitor and Combat Trafficking in Persons (2007–2009)
Frank Lavin, U.S. Ambassador to Singapore (2001–2005) (Republican)
David Floyd Lambertson, U.S. Ambassador to Thailand (1991–1995)
Joyce Ellen Leader, U.S. Ambassador to Guinea (1999–2000)
Richard LeBaron, U.S. Ambassador to Kuwait (2004–2007)
Alfonso E. Lenhardt, U.S. Ambassador to Tanzania (2009–2013)
Jeffrey D. Levine, U.S. Ambassador to Estonia (2012–2015)
Suzan G. LeVine, U.S. Ambassador to Switzerland and Liechtenstein (2014–2017)
Dawn M. Liberi, U.S. Ambassador to Burundi (2012–2016)
Carmen Lomellin, U.S. Ambassador to the Organization of American States (2009–2014)
Winston Lord, U.S. Ambassador to China (1984–1989) (Republican)
Douglas Lute, U.S. Ambassador to NATO (2013–2017)
Ray Mabus, Secretary of the Navy (2009–2017), U.S. Ambassador to Saudi Arabia (1994–1996), Governor of Mississippi (1988–1992)
Deborah R. Malac, U.S. Ambassador to Uganda (2016–2020), U.S. Ambassador to Liberia (2012–2015)
Robert A. Mandell, U.S. Ambassador to Luxembourg (2011–2015), chairman of the Florida Environmental Regulation Commission (1987–1990)
R. Niels Marquardt, U.S. Ambassador to Madagascar and Comoros (2007–2010), U.S. Ambassador to Equatorial Guinea (2004–2006), U.S. Ambassador to Cameroon (2001–2004)
Gail D. Mathieu, U.S. Ambassador to Namibia (2007–2010), U.S. Ambassador to Niger (2002–2005)
Marshall Fletcher McCallie, U.S. Ambassador to Namibia (1993–1996)
Stephen G. McFarland, U.S. Ambassador to Guatemala (2008–2011)
Michael McKinley, U.S. Ambassador to Brazil (2017–2018), U.S. Ambassador to Afghanistan (2015–2016), U.S. Ambassador to Colombia (2010–2014), U.S. Ambassador to Peru (2007–2010) (Republican)
Elizabeth Davenport McKune, U.S. Ambassador to Qatar (1998–2001)
Christopher McMullen, U.S. Ambassador to Angola (2010–2013)
James D. Melville Jr., U.S. Ambassador to Estonia (2015–2018)
Tom Miller, U.S. Ambassador to Greece (2001–2004), U.S. Ambassador to Bosnia and Herzegovina (1999–2001)
Richard Morningstar, U.S. Ambassador to Azerbaijan (2012–2015)
David D. Nelson, U.S. Ambassador to Uruguay (2009–2011)
Crystal Nix-Hines, U.S. Ambassador to UNESCO (2014–2017)
Lyndon Lowell Olson Jr., U.S. Ambassador to Sweden (1998–2001)
Kevin O'Malley, U.S. Ambassador to Ireland (2014–2017)
Louis O'Neill, U.S. Ambassador to the Organization for Security and Co-operation in Europe (2006–2008)
Robert Orr, U.S. Ambassador to the Asian Development Bank (2010–2016), president of Boeing Japan (2002–2007)
Joseph R. Paolino Jr., U.S. Ambassador to Malta (1994–1996)
June Carter Perry, U.S. Ambassador to Lesotho (2004–2007), U.S. Ambassador to Sierra Leone (2004–2007)
Nancy Bikoff Pettit, U.S. Ambassador to Latvia (2015–2019)
Joan M. Plaisted, U.S. Ambassador to Kiribati (1995–2000), U.S. Ambassador to the Marshall Islands (1995–2000), U.S. Ambassador to Morocco (1991–1994)
Nancy Jo Powell, U.S. Ambassador to India (2012–2014)
Maureen E. Quinn, U.S. Ambassador to Qatar (2001–2004)
Azita Raji, U.S. Ambassador to Sweden (2016–2017)
Charles A. Ray, U.S. Ambassador to Zimbabwe (2009–2012), Deputy Assistant Secretary of Defense for POW and Missing Personnel Affairs (2006–2009), U.S. Ambassador to Cambodia (2002–2005)
Julissa Reynoso, U.S. Ambassador to Uruguay (2012–2014)
Thomas Bolling Robertson, U.S. Ambassador to Slovenia (2004–2008)
James Rosapepe, U.S. Ambassador to Romania (1998–2001)
Leslie V. Rowe, U.S. Ambassador to Mozambique (2010–2012), U.S. Ambassador to Papua New Guinea (2006–2009), U.S. Ambassador to the Solomon Islands (2006–2009), U.S. Ambassador to Vanuatu (2006–2009)
William A. Rugh, U.S. Ambassador to North Yemen (1984–1987), U.S. Ambassador to the United Arab Emirates (1992–1995)
Catherine M. Russell, U.S. Ambassador-at-Large for Global Women's Issues (2013–2017)
Janet A. Sanderson, U.S. Ambassador to Haiti (2006–2009), U.S. Ambassador to Algeria (2000–2003)
Teresita Currie Schaffer, U.S. Ambassador to Sri Lanka (1992–1995), U.S. Ambassador to the Maldives (1992–1995)
Tom Schieffer, U.S. Ambassador to Japan (2005–2009), U.S. Ambassador to Australia (2001–2005)
Gregory Schulte, U.S. Ambassador to the International Atomic Energy Agency (2005–2009) (Republican)
Tod Sedgwick, U.S. Ambassador to Slovakia (2010–2015)
Daniel B. Shapiro, U.S. Ambassador to Israel (2011–2017)
Mattie R. Sharpless, U.S. Ambassador to the Central African Republic (2001–2003)
Robert A. Sherman, U.S. Ambassador to Portugal (2014–2017)
Dana Shell Smith, U.S. Ambassador to Qatar (2014–2017)
Nancy Soderberg, U.S. Ambassador to the United Nations for Special Political Affairs (1997–2001)
Alan Solomont, U.S. Ambassador to Spain and Andorra (2010–2013)
Daniel V. Speckhard, U.S. Ambassador to Greece (2007–2010), U.S. Ambassador to Belarus (1997–2000)
Carl Spielvogel, U.S. Ambassador to Slovakia (2000–2001)
Karen Clark Stanton, U.S. Ambassador to East Timor (2014–2017)
Charles Richard Stith, U.S. Ambassador to Tanzania (1998–2001)
Mark C. Storella, U.S. Ambassador to Zambia (2010–2013) (Republican)
Shirin R. Tahir-Kheli, Alternate United States Representative to the United Nations for Special Political Affairs (1990–1993) (Republican)
Robert H. Tuttle, U.S. Ambassador to the United Kingdom (2005–2009) (Republican)
Charles H. Twining, U.S. Ambassador to Cameroon (1995–1998), U.S. Ambassador to Equatorial Guinea (1995–1998), U.S. Ambassador to Cambodia (1994–1995), U.S. Ambassador to Benin (1982–1983)
Nicholas A. Veliotes, U.S. Ambassador to Jordan (1978–1981), U.S. Ambassador to Egypt (1984–1986)
Alexander Vershbow, U.S. Ambassador to NATO (1997–2001), U.S. Ambassador to Russia (2001–2005), U.S. Ambassador to South Korea (2005–2008)
Frederick Vreeland, U.S. Ambassador to Morocco (1992–1993)
Marcelle Wahba, U.S. Ambassador to the United Arab Emirates (2001–2004)
Jenonne R. Walker, U.S. Ambassador to the Czech Republic (1995–1998)
Marc M. Wall, U.S. Ambassador to Chad (2004–2007) (Nonpartisan)
James Donald Walsh, U.S. Ambassador to Argentina (2000–2003)
Mary Burce Warlick, U.S. Ambassador to Serbia (2010–2012)
Joseph W. Westphal, U.S. Ambassador to Saudi Arabia (2014–2017), Under Secretary of the Army (2009–2014), Secretary of the Army (2001)
Barry B. White, U.S. Ambassador to Norway (2009–2013)
Bisa Williams, U.S. Ambassador to Niger (2010–2013)
Duane Woerth, U.S. Representative on the council of the International Civil Aviation Organization (2010–2013)
Lee S. Wolosky, U.S. Special Envoy for the Closure of the Guantánamo Bay Detention Facility (2015–2017)
Mary Carlin Yates, U.S. Ambassador to Ghana (2002–2005), U.S. Ambassador to Burundi (1999–2002)
Johnny Young, U.S. Ambassador to Slovenia (2001–2004), U.S. Ambassador to Bahrain (1997–2001), U.S. Ambassador to Togo (1994–1997), U.S. Ambassador to Sierra Leone (1989–1992)
Marie Yovanovitch, U.S. Ambassador to Ukraine (2016–2019), U.S. Ambassador to Armenia, (2008–2011), U.S. Ambassador to Kyrgyzstan (2005–2008)
Susan L. Ziadeh, U.S. Ambassador to Qatar (2011–2014)
Anthony Zinni, U.S. Special Envoy for Qatar (2017–2019) (Independent)

Defense Department officials

Charles S. Abbot, deputy commander in chief of the U.S. European Command (1998–2000)
Clara Adams-Ender, Chief of the U.S. Army Nurse Corps (1987–1991)
James A. Adkins, former major general in the U.S. Army
Clifford Alexander Jr., U.S. Secretary of the Army (1977–1981)
Ricardo Aponte, brigadier general in the Air Force Reserve Command and the U.S. Air Force (1972–2007)
Donald Arthur, Surgeon General of the U.S. Navy (2004–2007)
Jeremy Bash, chief of staff to the U.S. Secretary of Defense (2011–2013), chief of staff to the director of the Central Intelligence Agency (2009–2011)
Charles Blanchard, General Counsel of the Army (1999–2001), General Counsel of the Air Force (2009–2013)
Ronald R. Blanck, Surgeon General of the U.S. Army (1996–2000)
Charles G. Boyd, four-star general in the U.S. Air Force (1959–1995)
John A. Bradley, lieutenant general in the U.S. Air Force (1967–2008)
David M. Brahms, brigadier general in the U.S. Marine Corps (1961–1988)
Douglas A. Brook, Assistant Secretary of the Navy (Financial Management and Comptroller) (2007–2009) (Republican)
Louis Caldera, U.S. Secretary of the Army (1998–2001), director of the White House Military Office (2009)
Donald M. Campbell Jr., lieutenant general in the U.S. Army (1978–2014)
Robert Cardillo, director of the National Geospatial-Intelligence Agency (2014–2019), deputy director of the Defense Intelligence Agency (2010)
Patrick G. Carrick, former deputy director of the Homeland Security Advanced Research Projects Agency
Antonia Chayes, Assistant Secretary of the Air Force (Manpower & Reserve Affairs) (1977–1979), U.S. Under Secretary of the Air Force (1979–1981)
Stephen A. Cheney, brigadier general in the U.S. Marine Corps (1971–2001)
Peter W. Chiarelli, four-star general in the U.S. Army (1972–2012)
Henry G. Chiles Jr., four-star admiral in the U.S. Navy (1960–1996)
Deborah P. Christie, Assistant Secretary of the Navy for Financial Management and Comptroller (1994–1998)
Wesley Clark, Supreme Allied Commander, Europe (1997–2000), 2004 candidate for president
Torie Clarke, Assistant to the Secretary of Defense for Public Affairs (2001–2003) (Republican)
Ronald S. Coleman, lieutenant general in the U.S. Navy (1968–1970) and the U.S. Marine Corps (1974–2009)
Erin Conaton, Under Secretary of Defense for Personnel and Readiness (2012)
Peter Cooke, commander of the 96th Regional Readiness Command
W. Craig Vanderwagen, rear admiral of the U.S. Public Health Service Commissioned Corps (1978–2006)
John Dalton, U.S. Secretary of the Navy (1993–1998)
Richard Danzig, U.S. Secretary of the Navy (1998–2001, Under Secretary of the Navy (1993–1997)
Rudy de Leon, U.S. Deputy Secretary of Defense (2000–2001), Under Secretary of Defense for Personnel and Readiness (1997–2000), Under Secretary of the Air Force (1994–1997)
Susan Y. Desjardins, former major general in the U.S. Air Force (1980–2012)
Richard T. Devereaux, former major general in the U.S. Air Force
Michael Donley, U.S. Secretary of the Air Force (2008–2013)(Republican)
John W. Douglass, Assistant Secretary of the Navy (1995–1998)
Raymond DuBois, acting Under Secretary of the Army (2005–2006) (Republican)
Paul Eaton, deputy chief of staff for operations and training at Fort Monroe
Mari K. Eder, major general in the U.S. Army (1977–2012)
Stephen C. Evans, rear admiral in the U.S. Navy (1986–2020)
John R. Ewers, major general in the U.S. Marine Corps (1984–2020)
Eric Fanning, U.S. Secretary of the Army (2016–2017) and acting secretary (2015–2016), Acting U.S. Secretary of the Air Force (2013)
Michèle Flournoy, Under Secretary of Defense for Policy (2009–2012)
Pat Foote, brigadier general in the U.S. Army (1959–1989)
Michael T. Franken, vice admiral in the U.S. Navy (1978–2017)
Juan M. Garcia III, Assistant Secretary of the Navy (Manpower and Reserve Affairs) (2009–2016)
Robert G. Gard Jr., lieutenant general in the U.S. Army (1950–1981)
Jonathan D. George, brigadier general in the U.S. Air Force (1981–2011)
Daniel B. Ginsberg, Assistant Secretary of the Air Force (Manpower & Reserve Affairs) (2009–2013)
Sherri W. Goodman, Assistant Secretary of Defense for Energy, Installations, and Environment (1993–2001)
Michael Green, senior adviser to the Office of Asia Pacific Affairs (1997–2000) (Republican)
Robert Hale, Under Secretary of Defense (Comptroller) (2009–2014)
Irv Halter, major general in the U.S. Air Force (1977–2009)
Ken Harbaugh, lieutenant in the U.S. Navy (1996–2005)
Robert Harding, former major general in the U.S. Army
Richard D. Hearney, four-star general in the U.S. Marine Corps (1962–1996)
Clare Helminiak, rear admiral in the U.S. Public Health Service Commissioned Corps (1983–2005)
Reynold N. Hoover, lieutenant general in the U.S. Army (1983–2020)
P. Gardner Howe III, former vice admiral in the U.S. Navy
John Hutson, former rear admiral in the U.S. Navy
Paul Ignatius, U.S. Secretary of the Navy (1967–1969)
Chris Inglis, Deputy Director of the National Security Agency (2006–2014)
Bobby Inman, Director of the National Security Agency (1977–1981), Deputy Director of Central Intelligence (1981–1982)
Deborah Lee James, U.S. Secretary of the Air Force (2013–2017)
Les Janka, Deputy Assistant Secretary of Defense for Near Eastern and African Affairs (1976–1978) (Republican)
Randy Jayne, major general in the U.S. Air Force and the Air National Guard (1962–2000)
James Johnson, major general in the U.S. Army (1950–1990)
Michelle D. Johnson, lieutenant general in the U.S. Air Force (1981–2017)
Michele S. Jones, U.S. Army Reserve (1982–2007), first woman to reach the position of command sergeant major of the U.S. Army Reserve
Jan-Marc Jouas, lieutenant general in the U.S. Air Force (1979–2015)
Frank Kendall III, Under Secretary of Defense for Acquisition and Sustainment (2011–2017)
Susan Koch, Nuclear reduction expert for the Secretary of Defense
Ken Krieg, Under Secretary of Defense for Acquisition and Sustainment (2005–2007) (Republican)
Thomas R. Lamont, Assistant Secretary of the Army (Manpower and Reserve Affairs) (2009–2013)
J. William Leonard, director of the Information Security Oversight Office (2002–present)
Frank Libutti, lieutenant general in the U.S. Marine Corps (1966–2001)
George E. Little, Assistant Secretary of Defense for Public Affairs (2012–2013)
Samuel J. Locklear, admiral in the U.S. Navy (1972–2015)
Deborah Loewer, rear admiral in the U.S. Navy (1976–2007), first woman promoted to a flagship rank in the U.S. Navy
Letitia Long, director of the National Geospatial-Intelligence Agency (2010–2014)
Charles D. Luckey, lieutenant general in the U.S. Army (1977–2020)
Michael D. Lumpkin, Under Secretary of Defense for Policy (2014), Assistant Secretary of Defense for Special Operations and Low-Intensity Conflict (2013–2015)
Boris Lushniak, U.S. Surgeon General (2013–2014)
David M. Maddox, four-star general in the U.S. Army (1960–1995)
Stanley McChrystal, general in the U.S. Army and Commander of U.S. forces in Afghanistan (2009–2010)
Merrill McPeak, U.S. Secretary of the Air Force (1993)
William H. McRaven, four-star admiral, commander of the U.S. Special Operations Command (2011–2014)
Dee McWilliams, major general in the U.S. Army (1974–2003)
Joseph V. Medina, brigadier general in the U.S. Marine Corps (1976–2007)
Christopher Mellon, Deputy Assistant Secretary of Defense for Intelligence (1999–2002)
James N. Miller, Under Secretary of Defense for Policy (2012–2014)
Kenneth P. Moritsugu, U.S. Surgeon General (2002, 2006–2007)
Charles L. Munns, vice admiral in the U.S. Navy (1974–2007)
Patrick Murphy, Acting U.S. Secretary of the Army (2016), Under Secretary of the Army (2016–2017), U.S. Representative from PA-08 (2007–2011)
Robert B. Murrett, director of the National Geospatial-Intelligence Agency (2006–2010)
Vivek Murthy, U.S. Surgeon General (2014–2017)
Michael Myatt, major general in the U.S. Marine Corps (1963–1995)
John B. Nathman, admiral in the U.S. Navy (1970–2007)
Lloyd W. Newton, four-star general in the U.S. Air Force (1966–2000)
Joseph Nye, Assistant Secretary of Defense for International Security Affairs (1994–1995)
Sean O'Keefe, NASA Administrator (2001–2004), Secretary of the Navy (1992–1993) (Republican)
David R. Oliver Jr., rear admiral (1963–1995)
Eric T. Olson, admiral in the U.S. Navy (1973–2011)
Charles P. Otstott, lieutenant general in the U.S. Army (1960–1990)
B.J. Penn, acting Secretary of the Navy (2009), Assistant Secretary of the Navy for Installations and Environment (2005–2009)
Whit Peters, U.S. Secretary of the Air Force (1999–2001), Under Secretary of the Air Force (1997–1999)
Robert B. Pirie Jr., acting Secretary of the Navy (2001), Under Secretary of the Navy (2000–2001)
Gale Pollock, Deputy Surgeon General of the U.S. Army (2006–2007), former major general in the U.S. Army
Fernandez Ponds, rear admiral in the U.S. Navy (1983–2015)
Kevin M. Quinn, former rear admiral in the U.S. Navy
Joe Reeder, Under Secretary of the Army (1993–1997)
Raymond F. Rees, major general in the U.S. Army (1966–2013)
Charles H. Roadman II, lieutenant general in the U.S. Air Force (1968–1999)
Patricia Rose, first openly LGBT major general in the U.S. Air Force (1984–2017)
Joseph E. Schmitz, Inspector General of the Department of Defense (2002–2005) (Republican)
Paul Selva, Vice Chairman of the Joint Chiefs of Staff (2015–2019)
Robert W. Sennewald, four-star General in the U.S. Army (1951–1986)
Walter B. Slocombe, Under Secretary of Defense for Policy (1994–2001)
Robert M. Speer, U.S. Secretary of the Army (2017){
Clifford L. Stanley, Under Secretary of Defense for Personnel and Readiness (2010–2011)
Howard D. Stendahl, Chief of Chaplains of the United States Air Force (1985–2015)
Maura Sullivan, assistant to the Secretary of Defense for Public Affairs (2015)
Loree Sutton, former brigadier general of the U.S. Army, candidate for Mayor of New York City in 2021
William Howard Taft IV, U.S. Deputy Secretary of Defense (1984–1989) and the great-grandson of President William Howard Taft (Republican)
Antonio Taguba, major general in the U.S. Army (1972–2007)
Paul E. Tobin Jr., rear admiral in the U.S. Navy (1963–1998)
Henry G. Ulrich III, four-star admiral in the U.S. Navy (1972–2007)
Robin Umberg, brigadier general of the U.S. Army (1973–2020)
Francis D. Vavala, Adjutant General of the Delaware Army National Guard (1999–2017)
Dale Vesser, lieutenant general in the U.S. Army (1954–1987)
Michael G. Vickers, Under Secretary of Defense for Intelligence (2011–2015) (Republican)
Matthew Waxman, Deputy Assistant Secretary of Defense for Detainee Affairs (2004–2005) (Republican)
Andrew C. Weber, Assistant Secretary of Defense for Nuclear, Chemical, and Biological Defense Programs (2009–2014)
Jack Weinstein, Lieutenant General of the U.S. Air Force (1982–2018)
Joseph J. Went, U.S. Marine Corps four-star general (1952–1990)
Sheila Widnall, U.S. Secretary of the Air Force (1993–1997)
Kayla Williams, former intelligence specialist in the U.S. Army, author
Michael J. Williams, U.S. Marine Corps four star general (1967–2002)
Margaret C. Wilmoth, former brigadier general in the U.S. Army Reserve
Jesse A. Wilson Jr., Commander of Naval Surface Force Atlantic (2017–2020)
Johnnie E. Wilson, four-star general in the U.S. Army (1961–1999)
Margaret H. Woodward, major general in the U.S. Army (1982–2014)
Dov Zakheim, Under Secretary of Defense (Comptroller) (2001–2004) (Republican)

Justice Department officials

A. Brian Albritton, U.S. Attorney for the Middle District of Florida (2008–2010) (Republican)
Donald B. Ayer, U.S. Deputy Attorney General (1989–1990), U.S. Attorney for the Eastern District of California (1981–1986) (Republican)
A. Lee Bentley, III, U.S. Attorney for the Middle District of Florida (2014–2017)
Daniel Bogden, U.S. Attorney for the District of Nevada (2001–2007, 2009–2017) (Republican)
Greg Brower, U.S. Attorney for the District of Nevada (2008–2009) (Republican)
Wayne Budd, U.S. Attorney for the District of Massachusetts (1989–1992), U.S. Associate Attorney General (1992–1993) (Republican)
John P. Carlin, U.S. Assistant Attorney General for the National Security Division (2014–2016)
Paul K. Charlton, U.S. Attorney for the District of Arizona (2001–2006) (Republican)
James M. Cole, U.S. Deputy Attorney General (2010–2015)
James Comey, Director of the Federal Bureau of Investigation (2013–2017), U.S. Deputy Attorney General (2003–2005) (Independent)
Roxanne Conlin, U.S. Attorney for the Southern District of Iowa (1977–1981)
Michael W. Cotter, U.S. Attorney for the District of Montana (2009–2017)
Deirdre M. Daly, U.S. Attorney for the District of Connecticut (2013–2017)
Steve Dettelbach, U.S. Attorney for the Northern District of Ohio (2009–2015)
Conner Eldridge, U.S. Attorney for the Western District of Arkansas (2010–2015)
David B. Fein, U.S. Attorney for the District of Connecticut (2010–2013)
Paul J. Fishman, U.S. Attorney for the District of New Jersey (2009–2017)
John P. Fishwick Jr., U.S. Attorney for the Western District of Virginia (2015–2017)
Charles Fried, U.S. Solicitor General (1985–1989) (Republican)
Deborah R. Gilg, U.S. Attorney for the District of Nebraska (2009–2017)
Jonathan L. Goldstein, U.S. Attorney for the District of New Jersey (1974–1977) (Republican)
Barry Grissom, U.S. Attorney for the District of Kansas (2010–2016)
Timothy J. Heaphy, U.S. Attorney for the Western District of Virginia (2009–2015)
Thomas B. Heffelfinger, U.S. Attorney for the District of Minnesota (1991–1993, 2001–2006) (Republican)
Dwight Holton, U.S. Attorney for the District of Oregon (2010–2011)
David Iglesias, U.S. Attorney for the District of New Mexico (2001–2006) (Republican)
Marcos Jimenez, U.S. Attorney for the Southern District of Florida (2002–2005) (Republican)
David N. Kelley, U.S. Attorney for the Southern District of New York (2003–2005) (Republican)
Nicholas A. Klinefeldt, U.S. Attorney for the Southern District of Iowa (2009–2015)
David S. Kris, U.S. Assistant Attorney General for the National Security Division (2009–2011)
Karen L. Loeffler, U.S. Attorney for the District of Alaska (2009–2017)
Neil MacBride, U.S. Attorney for the Eastern District of Virginia (2009–2013)
Ronald Machen, U.S. Attorney for the District of Columbia (2010–2015)
Kenneth Magidson, U.S. Attorney for the Southern District of Texas (2011–2017)
John McKay, U.S. Attorney for the Western District of Washington (2001–2006) (Republican)
Michael McKay, U.S. Attorney for the Western District of Washington (1989–1993) (Republican)
Patrick Miles Jr., U.S. Attorney for the Western District of Michigan (2012–2017)
Jan Paul Miller, U.S. Attorney for the Central District of Illinois (2002–2005) (Republican)
Lisa Monaco, Homeland Security Advisor (2013–2017), U.S. Assistant Attorney General for the National Security Division (2011–2013)
Bill Nettles, U.S. Attorney for the District of South Carolina (2010–2016)
Carmen Ortiz, U.S. Attorney for the District of Massachusetts (2009–2017)
Matthew D. Orwig, U.S. Attorney for the Eastern District of Texas (2001–2007) (Republican)
Paul Perez, U.S. Attorney for the Middle District of Florida (2002–2007) (Republican)
Tim Purdon, U.S. Attorney for the District of North Dakota (2010–2015)
Carole Rendon, U.S. Attorney for the Northern District of Ohio (2016–2017)
Sarah Saldaña, director of Immigration and Customs Enforcement (2014–2017), U.S. Attorney for the Northern District of Texas (2011–2014)
Kevin W. Techau, U.S. Attorney for the Northern District of Iowa (2014–2017)
Anne Tompkins, U.S. Attorney for the Western District of North Carolina (2010–2015)
Stanley Twardy, U.S. Attorney for the District of Connecticut (1985–1991) (Republican)
John W. Vaudreuil, U.S. Attorney for the Western District of Wisconsin (2010–2017)
Benjamin B. Wagner, U.S. Attorney for the Eastern District of California (2009–2016)
Kenneth L. Wainstein, U.S. Attorney for the District of Columbia (2004–2006), U.S. Assistant Attorney General for the National Security Division (2006–2008), U.S. Homeland Security Advisor (2008–2009) (Republican)
John F. Walsh, U.S. Attorney for the District of Colorado (2010–2016)
Bill Weld, U.S. Attorney for the District of Massachusetts (1981–1986), U.S. Assistant Attorney General for the Criminal Division (1986–1988), Governor of Massachusetts (1991–1997) (Republican)
Tony West, U.S. Assistant Attorney General for the Civil Division (2009–2012), U.S. Associate Attorney General (2012–2014), brother-in-law of Kamala Harris
Kinney Zalesne, Council to the U.S. Attorney General (1998–2003)

Homeland Security Department officials

Jarrod Bernstein, Principal Deputy Assistant Secretary for Intergovernmental Affairs (2009–2011)
James C. Card, vice admiral in the U.S. Coast Guard (1964–2000)
Richard Falkenrath, U.S. Deputy Secretary of Homeland Security (2003–2004) (Republican)
Alejandro Mayorkas, U.S. Deputy Secretary of Homeland Security (2013–2016), U.S. Secretary of Homeland Security (2021-present)
Betsy Markey, Assistant Secretary of Homeland Security for Intergovernmental Affairs (2011–2013), U.S. Representative from CO-04 (2009–2011)
John Mitnick, general counsel of the U.S. Department of Homeland Security (2018–2019) (Republican)
D. Brian Peterman, vice admiral in the U.S. Coast Guard (1973–2008)
Clyde Robbins, vice admiral in the U.S. Coast Guard (1955–1990)
Francis X. Taylor, Under Secretary of Homeland Security for Intelligence and Analysis (2014–2017)
Miles Taylor, chief of staff of the U.S. Department of Homeland Security (2017–2019) (Republican)
Paul Zukunft, former commandant of the United States Coast Guard (2014–2018)

Energy Department officials
Linton Brooks, Under Secretary of Energy for Nuclear Security and administrator of the National Nuclear Security Administration (2003–2007) (Republican)
Frank Klotz, Under Secretary of Energy for Nuclear Security (2014–2018)
Arun Majumdar, director of the Energy Advanced Research Projects Agency (2009–2012)
Franklin Orr, Under Secretary of Energy for Science (2014–2017)
Elizabeth Sherwood-Randall, Deputy Secretary of Energy (2014–2017)
Steve Spinner, stimulus adviser for the U.S. Department of Energy (2009–2010)

White House officials

Steve Abbot, Deputy Homeland Security Advisor (2001–2003) (Republican)
Kiran Ahuja, executive director of the White House Initiative on Asian Americans and Pacific Islanders (2009–2015)
Eli Attie, screenwriter, producer, White House speech writer (2000)
Kenneth Baer, associate director of communications for the White House's Office of Management and Budget (2009–2012)
Bruce Bartlett, author, historian, policy advisor to Ronald Reagan (Independent, former Republican)
Robert Bauer, White House Counsel (2010–2011)
Kenneth Bernard, special assistant to the president for biodefense and as assistant surgeon general (2002–2005) (Republican)
Jason Bordoff, member of the U.S. National Security Council (2009–2013)
Jake Braun, White House Liaison to the Department of Homeland Security
Victor Cha, director of Asian Affairs of the U.S. National Security Council (2004–2007) (Republican)
Aneesh Chopra, U.S. Chief Technology Officer (2009–2012)
Nelson Cunningham, senior advisor to the special envoy for the Americas
Nancy-Ann DeParle, White House Deputy Chief of Staff for Policy (2011–2013), director of the White House Office of Health Reform (2009–2011)
Barbaralee Diamonstein-Spielvogel, White House assistant (1963–1966)
Anita Dunn, White House Communications Director (2009)
R. P. Eddy, director of the U.S. National Security Council (1994–1996)
Gary Edson, Deputy National Security Advisor (2001–2004) (Republican)
Aaron Friedberg, deputy assistant to the vice president for National Security (2003–2005) (Republican)
Michael Gerson, White House director of speechwriting (2001–2006) (Republican)
Chad Griffin, former member of the White House Press Office
Avril Haines, Deputy National Security Advisor (2015–2017), Deputy Director of the Central Intelligence Agency (2013–2015)
Cynthia Hogan, counsel to the vice president (2009–2013)
John Holdren, director of the Office of Science and Technology Policy (2009–2017)
Joel Hunter, advisory counsel for the White House Office of Faith-Based and Neighborhood Partnerships (2009–2010)
Valerie Jarrett, director of the White House Office of Public Engagement and Intergovernmental Affairs (2009–2017), Senior Advisor to the President (2009–2017)
Colin Kahl, National Security Advisor to the Vice President (2014–2017)
Christopher A. Kojm, chair of the National Intelligence Council (2009–2014)
Gil Kerlikowske, commissioner of U.S. Customs and Border Protection (2014–2017), director of the Office of National Drug Control Policy (2009–2014), Chief of Police of Seattle, Washington (2001–2009)
Bill Kristol, Chief of Staff to the Vice President of the United States (1989–1993), founder of The Weekly Standard, editor of conservative The Bulwark
Anthony Lake, U.S. National Security Advisor (1993–1997), Director of Policy Planning (1977–1981)
Ann Lewis, Counselor to the President (1999–2001), White House Communications Director (1997–1999)
Chris Lu, White House Cabinet Secretary (2009–2013), U.S. Deputy Secretary of Labor (2014–2017)
Brett McGurk, Special Presidential Envoy for the Global Coalition to Counter the Islamic State of Iraq and the Levant (2015–2018)
John E. McLaughlin, Director of Central Intelligence (2004)
Jami Miscik, chair of the President's Intelligence Advisory Board (2014–2017)
Omarosa Manigault Newman, director of communications for the Office of Public Liaison (2017–2018) (Independent)
Gautam Raghavan, associate director of the Office of Public Engagement (2011–2014)
Steve Ricchetti, White House Deputy Chief of Staff for Operations (1998–2001) (National Chair)
Desirée Rogers, White House Social Secretary (2009–2010)
Dan K. Rosenthal, Assistant to the President and director of Advance (1997–2000), special assistant to the president and deputy director of Advance (1995–1997)
Anthony Scaramucci, White House Communications Director (2017) (Republican)
Greg Schultz, special assistant to the president (2013–2017) and senior advisor to Biden's campaign
Sonal Shah, director of the Office of Social Innovation and Civic Participation (2009–2011)
Stephen Slick, special assistant to the president (2005–2009) (Republican)
Mona Sutphen, White House Deputy Chief of Staff for policy (2009–2011)
Joseph Stiglitz, chair of the Council of Economic Advisers (1995–1997)
Olivia Troye, Homeland Security and Counterterrorism Advisor to Vice President Pence (2018–2020) (Republican)
Jeffrey Zients, director of the National Economic Council (2014–2017), acting director of the Office of Management and Budget (2012–2013, 2010)

Other executive branch officials

William Drea Adams, Chair of the National Endowment for the Humanities (2014–2017)
Kenneth Adelman, Arms Control and Disarmament Agency Director (1983–1987) (Republican)
Roger Altman, U.S. Deputy Secretary of the Treasury (1993–1994)
Hunter Biden, vice chairman of the National Railroad Passenger Corporation (2006–2009), Biden's son
Charles Bolden, Administrator of the National Aeronautics and Space Administration (2009–2017)
David Cohen, Deputy Director of the Central Intelligence Agency (2015–2017)
Nani A. Coloretti, Deputy Secretary of Housing and Urban Development (2014–2017), Assistant Secretary of the Treasury for Management (2012–2014)
Richard Cordray, director of the Consumer Financial Protection Bureau (2012–2017), 2018 nominee for Governor of Ohio
Leah D. Daughtry, assistant secretary for Administration and Management
James M. Galloway, former Public Health Service officer for Region V
W. Scott Gould, Deputy Secretary of Veterans Affairs (2009–2013)
Jimmy Gurulé, Under Secretary of the Treasury for Terrorism and Financial Intelligence (2001–2003) (Republican)
Jonathan Jarvis, director of the National Park Service (2009–2017)
Ray Jefferson, U.S. Assistant Secretary for the Veterans' Employment and Training Service (2009–2011)
Douglas Kamerow, U.S. Public Health Service employee (1979–2001)
Donald Kerr, Principal Deputy Director of National Intelligence (2007–2009) (Republican)
David A. Kessler, Commissioner of Food and Drugs (1990–1997)
Esther Kia'aina, Assistant Secretary of the Interior for Insular Areas (2014–2017)
Howard Koh, Assistant Secretary for Health (2009–2014)
Jim Leach, chair of the National Endowment for the Humanities (2009–2013), U.S. Representative from IA-02 (2003–2007), chair of the House Committee on Financial Services (1995–2001) (Republican)
Michael Leiter, director of the National Counterterrorism Center (2007–2011) (Republican)
Chris Lu, Deputy Secretary of Labor (2014–2017), White House Cabinet Secretary (2009–2013)
Jane Lubchenco, administrator of the National Oceanic and Atmospheric Administration (2009–2013), Under Secretary of Commerce for Oceans and Atmosphere (2009–2013)
Rosario Marin, Treasurer of the United States (2001–2003) (Republican)
Sharon McGowan, former acting general counsel for Policy at the U.S. Office of Personnel Management
Susan Ness, Commissioner of the Federal Communications Commission (1994–2001)
Dava Newman, Deputy Administrator of the National Aeronautics and Space Administration (2015–2017)
Matthew G. Olsen, director of the National Counterterrorism Center (2011–2014)
Edward Powell Jr., U.S. Deputy Secretary of Veterans Affairs (2000–2001)
Clyde V. Prestowitz Jr., former counselor to the U.S. Secretary of Commerce (Republican)
Sonny Ramaswamy, administrator of the National Institute of Food and Agriculture (2012–2018)
Robert Roche, former member of the Advisory Committee for Trade Policy and Negotiations
Lillian Salerno, Deputy Undersecretary for Rural Development, U.S. Department of Agriculture (2015–2017)
Rob Shepardson, former member of the President's Council on Sports, Fitness, and Nutrition
Marc Stanley, former Council Member of the U.S. Holocaust Memorial Museum
Eric Stein, Deputy Assistant Secretary for Consumer Protection at the U.S. Treasury Department (2009–2010)
Joshua Steiner, chief of staff of the U.S. Treasury Department (1993–2001)
Kathryn D. Sullivan, Under Secretary of Commerce for Oceans and Atmosphere and administrator of the National Oceanic and Atmospheric Administration (2013–2017), former NASA astronaut
Neera Tanden, senior advisor in the U.S. Department of Health and Human Services
John D. Trasviña, Assistant Secretary of Housing and Urban Development for Fair Housing and Equal Opportunity (2009–2014)
Harold E. Varmus, director of the National Cancer Institute (2010–2015), director of the National Institutes of Health (1993–1999)
Juan Verde, U.S. Department of Commerce, International Trade Administration, Deputy Assistant Secretary of Europe (2009–2011)
Robert A. Whitney, acting Surgeon General of the United States (1993)

U.S. Congress

Former federal judicial officials
Moe Davis, Administrative Law Judge in the U.S. Department of Labor (2015–2019), Chief Prosecutor of the Guantanamo military commissions (2005–2007)
Lacy Thornburg, judge of the U.S. District Court for the Western District of North Carolina (1995–2009), Attorney General of North Carolina (1985–1993)

State, territorial, and tribal executive officials

Current governors

State and territorial

Andy Beshear, Governor of Kentucky (2019–present), Attorney General of Kentucky (2016–2019)
Muriel Bowser, Mayor of the District of Columbia (2015–present) (governor-equivalent)
Kate Brown, Governor of Oregon (2015–present), Secretary of State of Oregon (2009–2015)
Albert Bryan, Governor of the United States Virgin Islands (2019–present)
Steve Bullock, Governor of Montana (2013–2021), 2020 nominee for Senate, 2020 candidate for president, chair of the National Governors Association (2018–2019), Attorney General of Montana (2009–2013)
John Carney, Governor of Delaware (2017–present), U.S. Representative from DE-AL (2011–2017)
Roy Cooper, Governor of North Carolina (2017–present), Attorney General of North Carolina (2001–2017)
Andrew Cuomo, Governor of New York (2011–2021), chair of the National Governors Association (2020–2021), Attorney General of New York (2007–2010), U.S. Secretary of Housing and Urban Development (1997–2001)
John Bel Edwards, Governor of Louisiana (2016–present), minority leader of the Louisiana House of Representatives (2012–2015), member of the Louisiana House of Representatives 72nd district (2008–2015)
Tony Evers, Governor of Wisconsin (2019–present), Superintendent of Public Instruction of Wisconsin (2009–2019)
Michelle Lujan Grisham, Governor of New Mexico (2019–present), U.S. Representative from NM-01 (2013–2019)
Lou Leon Guerrero, Governor of Guam (2019–present), senator of the Guam Legislature (1995–2005)
Jay Inslee, Governor of Washington (2013–present), U.S. Representative for WA-01 (1999–2012) and WA-04 (1993–1995), 2020 candidate for president
Ned Lamont, Governor of Connecticut (2019–present)
Janet Mills, Governor of Maine (2019–present), Attorney General of Maine (2013–2019)
Lolo Matalasi Moliga, Governor of American Samoa (2013–2021)
Phil Murphy, Governor of New Jersey (2018–present)
Gavin Newsom, Governor of California (2019–present), Lieutenant Governor of California (2011–2019), Mayor of San Francisco, California (2004–2011)
Ralph Northam, Governor of Virginia (2018–2022), Lieutenant Governor of Virginia (2014–2018), member of the Virginia Senate from the 6th district (2008–2014)
Jared Polis, Governor of Colorado (2019–present), U.S. Representative from CO-02 (2009–2019)
J. B. Pritzker, Governor of Illinois (2019–present)
Gina Raimondo, Governor of Rhode Island (2015–2021), treasurer of Rhode Island (2011–2015)
Phil Scott, Governor of Vermont (2017–present), Lieutenant Governor of Vermont (2011–2017) (Republican)
Steve Sisolak, Governor of Nevada (2019–present), chair of the Clark County Commission (2013–2019)
Tim Walz, Governor of Minnesota (2019–present), U.S. Representative from MN-01 (2007–2019)
Gretchen Whitmer, Governor of Michigan (2019–present), minority leader of the Michigan Senate (2011–2015) (National Co-Chair)
Tom Wolf, Governor of Pennsylvania (2015–present), Secretary of Revenue of Pennsylvania (2007–2008)

Tribal leaders and governor-equivalent officials
Gabe Aguilar, president of the Mescalero Apache Tribe
W. Ron Allen, chairman of the Jamestown S'Klallam Tribe of Washington (1977–present)
Ricky Armstrong, president of the Seneca Nation of New York
Floyd Azure, chairman of the Fort Peck Indian Reservation (2015–present)
Jamie Azure, chairman of the Turtle Mountain Band of Chippewa Indians (2018–present)
Melanie Benjamin, chief executive of the Mille Lacs Band of Ojibwe (2000–2008, 2012–present)
Devon Boyer, chairman of the Shoshone-Bannock of Fort Hall
Shelley Buck, president of the Prairie Island Indian Community
Rodney Butler, chair of the Mashantucket Pequot Tribe (2010–present)
Frances Charles, chairwoman of the Lower Elwha Klallam Tribe
E. Ken Choke, chairman of the Nisqually Reservation
Michael Conners, Chief of the St. Regis Mohawk Reservation
Cedric Cromwell, Tribal Council Chairman of the Mashpee Wampanoag Tribe (2009–present)
Carol Evans, chairwoman of the Spokane Tribe of Indians
Leonard Forsman, chairman of the Suquamish Tribe
Mark Fox, chairman of the Mandan, Hidatsa, and Arikara Nation
Harold Frazier, chairman of the Cheyenne River Indian Reservation (2014–present)
Teri Gobin, chairwoman of the Tulalip (2019–present)
Shannon Holsey, president of the Stockbridge–Munsee Community (2015–present)
Delbert Hopkins, chairman of the Sisseton Wahpeton Oyate
Michael Hunter, Tribal Chairman of the Coyote Valley Band of Pomo Indians (2013–present)
Faron Jackson, chairman of the Leech Lake Band of Ojibwe (2016–present)
Norma Jean, chairwoman of the Sauk-Suiattle Indian Tribe of Washington
Kenneth Kahn, chairman of the Santa Ynez Band of Chumash Mission Indians
Stephen Roe Lewis, Governor of the Gila River Indian Community (2014–present)
Mark Macarro, chairman of the Pechanga Band of Luiseño Indians
Marilynn Malerba, Chief of the Mohegan Tribe (2010–present)
Margie Mejia, chairwoman of the Lytton Band of Pomo Indians
Robert Miguel, Council Chairman of the Ak-Chin Indian Community (2017–present)
Guy Miller, chairman of the Skokomish Indian Tribe
Bryan Newland, president of the Bay Mills Indian Community (2017–present)
Jonathan Nez, President of the Navajo Nation (2019–present)
Ned Norris Jr., chairman of the Tohono Oʼodham Nation (2007–2015, 2019–present)
Timothy Nuvangyaoma, chairman of the Hopi Reservation (2017–present)
Dennis Patch, chairman of the Colorado River Indian Tribes (2018–present)
Aaron Payment, Governor of the Sault Tribe of Chippewa Indians (2004–2008, 2012–present)
Bob Peters, chairperson of the Match-e-be-nash-she-wish Band of Pottawatomi Indians of Michigan (2018–present)
Marshall Pierite, chairman of the Tunica-Biloxi (2018–present)
Erica Pinto, chairwoman of the Jamul Indian Village (2015–present)
Rhonda Pitka, First Chief of Beaver Village
Julian R. President, president of the Oglala Lakota Nation
Terry Rambler, chairman of the San Carlos Apache Indian Reservation
Delano Saluskin, chairman of the Yakama Indian Reservation (2020–present)
Darrell G. Seki Sr., chairman of the Red Lake Indian Reservation
Fawn Sharp, president of the Quinault Indian Nation
Lawrence Solomon, chairman of the Lummi Nation
Lee Spoonhunter, chairman of the Northern Arapaho Tribe
Bill Sterud, chairman of the Puyallup Tribe of Indians
Patrick Suarez, councilman of the Meherrin Nation
Warren Swartz, Tribal President of the Keweenaw Bay Indian Community (2018–present)
Edward Thomas, president of the Tlingit Haida Indian Tribes of Alaska
Amber Torres, chairwoman of the Walker River Paiute Tribe
Mike Williams, chair of the Akiak Native Community
Thomas Wooten, chairman of the Samish Indian Nation

Former governors

George Ariyoshi, Governor of Hawaii (1973–1986), Lieutenant Governor of Hawaii (1970–1974)
John Baldacci, Governor of Maine (2003–11), U.S. Representative from ME-02 (1995–2003), Member of the Maine Senate from the 9th district (1982–94)
Roy Barnes, Governor of Georgia (1999–2003)
Steve Beshear, Governor of Kentucky (2007–2015), Lieutenant Governor of Kentucky (1983–1987), Attorney General of Kentucky (1979–1983)
Jerry Brown, Governor of California (1975–1983, 2011–2019), Attorney General of California (2007–2011), Mayor of Oakland, California (1999–2007), Secretary of State of California (1971–1975), 1976, 1980, and 1992 candidate for president
John W. Carlin, Governor of Kansas (1979–1987), chair of the National Governors Association (1984–1985), Archivist of the United States (1995–2005)
Ben Cayetano, Governor of Hawaii (1994–2002), Lieutenant Governor of Hawaii (1986–1994)
Arne Carlson, Governor of Minnesota (1991–1999), Minnesota State Auditor (1979–1991) (Republican)
Richard J. Codey, Governor of New Jersey (2004–2006), president of the New Jersey Senate (2002–2010)
Jon Corzine, Governor of New Jersey (2006–2010), U.S. Senator from New Jersey (2001–2006)
Chet Culver, Governor of Iowa (2007–2011), Secretary of State of Iowa (1999–2007)
Gray Davis, Governor of California (1999–2003), Lieutenant Governor of California (1995–1999)
Mark Dayton, Governor of Minnesota (2011–2019), U.S. Senator from Minnesota (2001–2007), Minnesota State Auditor (1991–1995)
Howard Dean, Governor of Vermont (1991–2003), chair of the Democratic National Committee (2005–2009), chair of the National Governors Association (1994–1995), Lieutenant Governor of Vermont (1987–1991), 2004 candidate for president
Jim Doyle, Governor of Wisconsin (2003–2011), Attorney General of Wisconsin (1991–2003)
Michael Dukakis, Governor of Massachusetts (1975–1979, 1983–1991), 1988 nominee for president
Mike Easley, Governor of North Carolina (2001–2009), Attorney General of North Carolina (1993–2001)
Jim Edgar, Governor of Illinois (1991–1999), Secretary of State of Illinois (1981–1991) (Republican)
Alejandro García Padilla, Governor of Puerto Rico (2013–2017)
Parris Glendening, Governor of Maryland (1995–2003), chair of the National Governors Association (2000–2001)
Jennifer Granholm, Governor of Michigan (2003–2011), Attorney General of Michigan (1999–2003)
 Bill Graves, Governor of Kansas (1995-2003) (Republican) 
Christine Gregoire, Governor of Washington (2005–2013), chair of the National Governors Association (2010–2011), Attorney General of Washington (1993–2005)
John Hickenlooper, chair of the National Governors Association (2014–2015), Governor of Colorado (2011–2019), Mayor of Denver, Colorado (2003–2011), 2020 candidate for president and 2020 nominee for Senate
Jim Hodges, Governor of South Carolina (1999–2003)
Bob Holden, Governor of Missouri (2001–2005), State Treasurer of Missouri (1993–2001)
Jim Hunt, Governor of North Carolina (1977–1985, 1993–2001), Lieutenant Governor of North Carolina (1973–1977)
John Kasich, Governor of Ohio (2011–2019), 2016 candidate for president (Republican)
Tony Knowles, Governor of Alaska (1994–2004) Mayor of Anchorage, Alaska (1981–1987)
Ted Kulongoski, Governor of Oregon (2003–2011), associate justice of the Oregon Supreme Court (1997–2001), Attorney General of Oregon (1993–1997)
John Lynch, Governor of New Hampshire (2005–2013)
Dannel Malloy, Governor of Connecticut (2011–2019), Mayor of Stamford (1995–2009)
Jack Markell, Governor of Delaware (2009–2017), chair of the National Governors Association (2012–2013)
Terry McAuliffe, Governor of Virginia (2014–2018), chair of the National Governors Association (2016–2017)
Jim McGreevey, Governor of New Jersey (2002–2004), Mayor of Woodbridge Township, New Jersey (1992–2002)
Bob Miller, Governor of Nevada (1989–1999), chair of the National Governors Association (1989–1999)
Ronnie Musgrove, Governor of Mississippi (2000–2004), Lieutenant Governor of Mississippi (1996–2000)
Jay Nixon, Governor of Missouri (2009–2017), Attorney General of Missouri (1993–2009)
Martin O'Malley, Governor of Maryland (2007–2015), 2016 candidate for president (previously endorsed Beto O'Rourke)
Deval Patrick, Governor of Massachusetts (2007–2015), 2020 candidate for president
Pat Quinn, Governor of Illinois (2009–2015), Lieutenant Governor of Illinois (2003–2009), Treasurer of Illinois (1991–1995)
Marc Racicot, Governor of Montana (1993–2001), Attorney General of Montana (1989–1993), chair of the Republican National Committee (2001–2003) (Republican)
Ed Rendell, Governor of Pennsylvania (2003–2011), chair of the National Governors Association (2008–2009), General Chair of the Democratic National Committee (1999–2001)
Bill Ritter, Governor of Colorado (2007–2011), District Attorney of Denver (1993–2005) (previously endorsed Michael Bennet)
Roy Romer, Governor of Colorado (1987–1999), General Chair of the Democratic National Committee (1997–1999), chair of the National Governors Association (1992–1993)
Bill Sheffield, Governor of Alaska (1982–1986)
Peter Shumlin, Governor of Vermont (2011–2017)
Don Siegelman, Governor of Alabama (1999–2003), Lieutenant Governor of Alabama (1995–1999), Attorney General of Alabama (1987–1991), Secretary of State of Alabama (1979–1987)
Rick Snyder, Governor of Michigan (2011–2019) (Republican)
John D. Waihe'e III, Governor of Hawaii (1986–1994), Lieutenant Governor of Hawaii (1982–1986)
Peterson Zah, President of the Navajo Nation (1991–1995) (governor-equivalent)

Lieutenant governors

Current state and territorial

Mandela Barnes, Lieutenant Governor of Wisconsin (2019–present)
Susan Bysiewicz, Lieutenant Governor of Connecticut (2019–present), Secretary of State of Connecticut (1999–2011)
John Fetterman, Lieutenant Governor of Pennsylvania (2019–present), Mayor of Braddock, Pennsylvania (2005–2019)
Peggy Flanagan, Lieutenant Governor of Minnesota (2019–present)
Garlin Gilchrist, Lieutenant Governor of Michigan (2019–present)
Kathy Hochul, Lieutenant Governor of New York (2015–2021)
Eleni Kounalakis, Lieutenant Governor of California (2019–present)
Kate Marshall, Lieutenant Governor of Nevada (2019–2021), Treasurer of Nevada (2007–2015)
Daniel McKee, Lieutenant Governor of Rhode Island (2015–2021)
Sheila Oliver, Lieutenant Governor of New Jersey (2018–present)
Juliana Stratton, Lieutenant Governor of Illinois (2019–present)
Josh Tenorio, Lieutenant Governor of Guam (2019–present)
David Zuckerman, Lieutenant Governor of Vermont (2017–2021), 2020 nominee for Governor of Vermont (Vermont Progressive)

Current tribal
Jason Cooke, vice chairman of the Yankton Sioux Tribe (2017–present)
Jefferson Keel, Lieutenant Governor of the Chickasaw Nation
Jodie Palmer, vice chair of the Match-e-be-nash-she-wish Band of Pottawatomi Indians of Michigan (2017–present)
Wendy Schlater, Vice Chairwoman of the La Jolla Band of Luiseno Indians (2013–present)
Richard Silliboy, Vice Chief of the Miꞌkmaq
Brandon Yellowtail Stevens, vice-chairman of Oneida Nation of Wisconsin
Clark Tenakhongva, vice chair of the Hopi Reservation (2009–present)

Former

Bill Baxley, Lieutenant Governor of Alabama (1983–1987), Attorney General of Alabama (1971–1979)
Doug Chin, Lieutenant Governor of Hawaii (2018), Attorney General of Hawaii (2015–2018)
Kathy Davis, Lieutenant Governor of Indiana (2003–2005)
Lee Fisher, Dean of Cleveland–Marshall College of Law (2017–present), Lieutenant Governor of Ohio (2007–2011), Attorney General of Ohio (1991–1995)
Jefferson Keel, Lieutenant Governor of Chickasaw Nation (1999–2019) (Lieutenant Governor-equivalent)
Kathleen Kennedy Townsend, Lieutenant Governor of Maryland (1995–2003)
John Mutz, Lieutenant Governor of Indiana (1981–1989) (Republican)
Barbara O'Brien, Lieutenant Governor of Colorado (2007–2011)
Thomas P. O'Neill III, Lieutenant Governor of Massachusetts (1975–1983)
Michael Steele, Lieutenant Governor of Maryland (2003–2007), chair of the Republican National Committee (2009–2011), chair of the Maryland Republican Party (2000–2002) (Republican)
Shan Tsutsui, Lieutenant Governor of Hawaii (2012–2018)
Fran Ulmer, Lieutenant Governor of Alaska (1994–2002), Mayor of Juneau, Alaska (1983–1985)

Secretaries of State

Current state and territorial

Jocelyn Benson, Secretary of State of Michigan (2019–present), Dean of the Wayne State University Law School (2012–2016)
Alex Padilla, Secretary of State of California (2015–2021)
Jesse White, Secretary of State of Illinois (1999–present)

Tribal
Michelle Beaudin, secretary-treasurer of the Lac Courte Oreilles Tribe (2019–present)
Jeff Martin, Secretary of the Match-e-be-nash-she-wish Band of Pottawatomi Indians of Michigan (2016–present)
Christie Modlin, Tribal Secretary of the Iowa Tribe of Oklahoma, former chairman

Former

Robin Carnahan, Secretary of State of Missouri (2005–2013)
Jason Kander, Secretary of State of Missouri (2013–2017)
Kathy Karpan, Secretary of State of Wyoming (1987–1995)
John P. McDonough, Secretary of State of Maryland (2008–2015)

Attorneys general

Current

Hector Balderas, Attorney General of New Mexico (2015–present), New Mexico State Auditor (2007–2015)
Xavier Becerra, Attorney General of California (2017–2021), House Democratic Assistant to the Leader (2007–2009), U.S. Representative from CA-34 (2013–2017), CA-31 (2003–2013), and CA-30 (1993–2003)
T.J. Donovan, Attorney General of Vermont (2017–present)
Keith Ellison, Attorney General of Minnesota (2019–present), U.S. representative from MN-05 (2007–2019)
Bob Ferguson, Attorney General of Washington (2013–present)
Aaron D. Ford, Attorney General of Nevada (2019–present), majority leader (2016–2018) and minority leader (2014–2016) of the Nevada Senate
Aaron Frey, Attorney General of Maine (2019–present)
Brian Frosh, Attorney General of Maryland (2015–present)
Gurbir Grewal, Attorney General of New Jersey (2018–present)
Maura Healey, Attorney General of Massachusetts (2015–present)
Mark Herring, Attorney General of Virginia (2014–present)
Letitia James, Attorney General of New York (2019–present)
Kathy Jennings, Attorney General of Delaware (2019–present)
Josh Kaul, Attorney General of Wisconsin (2019–present)
Tom Miller, Attorney General of Iowa (1995–present, 1979–1991) (previously endorsed Steve Bullock)
Peter Neronha, Attorney General of Rhode Island (2019–present), U.S. Attorney for the District of Rhode Island (2009–2017)
Dana Nessel, Attorney General of Michigan (2019–present)
Karl Racine, Attorney General of the District of Columbia (2015–present)
Kwame Raoul, Attorney General of Illinois (2019–present)
Ellen Rosenblum, Attorney General of Oregon (2012–present)
Josh Shapiro, Attorney General of Pennsylvania (2017–present)
Josh Stein, Attorney General of North Carolina (2017–present)
William Tong, Attorney General of Connecticut (2019–present)
Phil Weiser, Attorney General of Colorado (2019–present), Dean of the University of Colorado Law School (2011–2016)

Former

Robert Abrams, Attorney General of New York (1979–1993)
Jeff Amestoy, Chief Justice of the Vermont Supreme Court (1997–2004), Attorney General of Vermont (1985–1997)(Republican)
Doug Baily, Attorney General of Alaska (1989–1990)(Republican)
Thurbert Baker, Attorney General of Georgia (1997–2011)
Rosalie Ballentine, Attorney General of the United States Virgin Islands (1991–1995)
Paul Bardacke, Attorney General of New Mexico (1983–1986)
Bruce Botelho, Attorney General of Alaska (1994–2002), Mayor of Juneau, AK (2003–2012, 1988–1991)
Ethel Branch, Attorney General of the Navajo Nation (2015–2019) (attorney general-equivalent)
Margery Bronster, Attorney General of Hawaii (1995–1999)
Bob Butterworth, Attorney General of Florida (1987–2002)
Bonnie Campbell, Attorney General of Iowa (1991–1995)
Pamela Carter, Attorney General of Indiana (1993–1997)
Steve Clark, Attorney General of Arkansas (1979–1991)
Martha Coakley, Attorney General of Massachusetts (2007–2015)
Mike Cody, Attorney General of Tennessee (1984–1988)
Walter Cohen, Attorney General of Pennsylvania (1995) (Republican)
Jack Conway, Attorney General of Kentucky (2008–2016)
Frederick Cooke, Attorney General of the District of Columbia (1987–1990)
Robert E. Cooper Jr., Attorney General of Tennessee (2006–2014)
J. Joseph Curran Jr., Attorney General of Maryland (1987–2007), Lieutenant Governor of Maryland (1983–1987)
Frankie Sue Del Papa, Attorney General of Nevada (1991–2003), Secretary of State of Nevada (1987–1991)
Michael Delaney, Attorney General of New Hampshire (2009–2013)
Matthew Denn, Attorney General of Delaware (2015–2019), Lieutenant Governor of Delaware (2009–2015), Insurance Commissioner of Delaware (2005–2009)
M. Jerome Diamond, Attorney General of Vermont (1975–1981)
Rufus Edmisten, Attorney General of North Carolina (1974–1984), Secretary of State of North Carolina (1989–1996)
Drew Edmondson, Attorney General of Oklahoma (1995–2011)
Joseph Foster, Attorney General of New Hampshire (2013–2017)
Karen Freeman-Wilson, Attorney General of Indiana (2000–2001), Mayor of Gary, IN (2012–2019)
Steve Freudenthal, chair of the Wyoming Democratic Party (1999–2001), Attorney General of Wyoming (1981–1983)
Doug Gansler, Attorney General of Maryland (2007–2015)
Terry Goddard, Attorney General of Arizona (2003–2011), Mayor of Phoenix, AZ (1984–1990)
Chris Gorman, Attorney General of Kentucky (1992–1996)
Jan Graham, Attorney General of Utah (1993–2001)
Scott Harshbarger, Attorney General of Massachusetts (1991–1999)
Neil Hartigan, Attorney General of Illinois (1983–1991), Lieutenant Governor of Illinois (1973–1977)
Peter C. Harvey, Attorney General of New Jersey (2003–2006)
Mike Hatch, Attorney General of Minnesota (1999–2007)
Jim Hood, Attorney General of Mississippi (2004–2020)
Skip Humphrey, Attorney General of Minnesota (1983–1999)
Richard Ieyoub, Attorney General of Louisiana, (1992–2003)
George Jepsen, Attorney General of Connecticut (2011–2019)
Jim Jones, Chief Justice (2015–2017) and justice (2015–2017) of the Idaho Supreme Court, Attorney General of Idaho (1983–1991) (Republican)
Drew Ketterer, Attorney General of Maine (1995–2001)
Peter Kilmartin, Attorney General of Rhode Island (2011–2019)
Gary King, Attorney General of New Mexico (2007–2015)
Oliver Koppell, Attorney General of New York (1994)
Jahna Lindemuth, Attorney General of Alaska (2016–2018) (Independent)
Bill Lockyer, Treasurer of California (2007–2015), Attorney General of California (1999–2007), President pro tempore of the California Senate (1994–1998)
David M. Louie, Attorney General of Hawaii (2011–2014)
Lisa Madigan, Attorney General of Illinois (2003–2019)
Patricia A. Madrid, Attorney General of New Mexico (1999–2007)
Robert Marks, Attorney General of Hawaii (1992–1995)
Dustin McDaniel, Attorney General of Arkansas (2007–2015)
Frank Mendicino, Attorney General of Wyoming (1975–1978)
Anne Milgram, Attorney General of New Jersey (2007–2010)
Mike Moore, Attorney General of Mississippi (1988–2004)
Jeff Modisett, Attorney General of Indiana (1997–2000)
Irvin B. Nathan, Attorney General of the District of Columbia (2011–2014), general counsel of the U.S. House of Representatives (2007–2011)
Charles Oberly, U.S. Attorney for the District of Delaware (2010–2017), Attorney General of Delaware (1983–1995)
Jeffrey B. Pine, Attorney General of Rhode Island (1993–1999) (Republican)
Edwin L. Pittman, Chief Justice (2001–2004) and justice (1989–2004) of the Supreme Court of Mississippi, Attorney General of Mississippi (1984–1988)
Warren Price, Attorney General of Hawaii (1986–1992)
Thomas Reilly, Attorney General of Massachusetts (1999–2007)
Clarine Nardi Riddle, Secretary of Justice of Puerto Rico (1981–1983)
Hector Reichard, Secretary of Justice of Puerto Rico (1981–1983)
Nancy H. Rogers, Attorney General of Ohio (2008–2009), Dean of Moritz College of Law (2001–2006)
Stephen Rosenthal, Attorney General of Virginia (1993–1994)
Luis Sánchez Betances, Secretary of Justice of Puerto Rico (2013)
Mark Shurtleff, Attorney General of Utah (2001–2013) (Republican)
Steve Six, Attorney General of Kansas (2008–2011)
Gregory Smith, Attorney General of New Hampshire (1980–1984) (Republican)
James C. Smith, Secretary of State of Florida (2002–2003, 1987–1995), Attorney General of Florida (1979–1987) (Republican)
Bill Sorrell, Attorney General of Vermont (1997–2017)
Robert Spagnoletti, Attorney General of the District of Columbia (2004–2006)
Lori Swanson, Attorney General of Minnesota (2007–2019)
Mary Sue Terry, Attorney General of Virginia (1986–1993)
James Tierney, Attorney General of Maine (1981–1991)
Anthony Troy, Attorney General of Virginia (1977–1978)
Mike Turpen, Attorney General of Oklahoma (1983–1987)
John Knox Walkup, Attorney General of Tennessee (1997–1999)
Grant Woods, Attorney General of Arizona (1991–1999) (Republican before 2018, Democratic from 2018–present)
James R. Zazzali, Chief Justice (2006–2007) and associate justice (2000–2006) of the New Jersey Supreme Court, Attorney General of New Jersey (1981–1982)
Greg Zoeller, Attorney General of Indiana (2009–2017) (Republican)

Other executive elected officials

Current state

Nikki Fried, Agriculture Commissioner of Florida (2019–present)
Nicole Galloway, 2020 nominee for Governor of Missouri, State Auditor of Missouri (2015–present)
Sarah Godlewski, Treasurer of Wisconsin (2019–present)
Richard Hodges, director of the Ohio Department of Health (2014–2017), Ohio House Representative (1993–1999) (Republican)
Kathy Hoffman, Arizona Superintendent of Public Instruction (2019–present)
Sandra Kennedy, member of the Arizona Corporation Commission (2019–present)
Fiona Ma, Treasurer of California (2019–present), Speaker pro tempore of the California State Assembly (2010–2012)
Susana Mendoza, Comptroller of Illinois (2016–present)
Joe Torsella, Treasurer of Pennsylvania (2016–present), U.S. Representative to the United Nations for Management and Reform (with the rank of ambassador) (2011–2014), chair and chief executive of the National Constitution Center (2006–2009, 1997–2003)
Betty Yee, Controller of California (2015–present)

Tribal
John Daniels Jr, treasurer of the Muckleshoot Indian Tribe
Misty Napeahi, treasurer of the Tulalip
Tommie Williamson, treasurer of the Match-e-be-nash-she-wish Band of Pottawatomi Indians of Michigan (2018–present)

Former

Phil Angelides, California State Treasurer (1999–2007)
Rebecca Holcombe, Vermont Secretary of Education (2014–2018)
Lisa Graham Keegan, Arizona Superintendent of Public Instruction (1995–2001) (Republican)
Andrew Sidamon-Eristoff, New Jersey State Treasurer (2010–2015) (Republican)
Lynn Simons, Wyoming Superintendent of Public Instruction (1979–1991)
Inez Tenenbaum, South Carolina Superintendent of Education (1999–2007)
Steve Westly, California State Controller (2003–2007)

State and territorial legislative officials

State, territorial, and tribal judicial officials

Current
Cheri Beasley, Chief Justice of the North Carolina Supreme Court (2019–2020), associate justice of the North Carolina Supreme Court (2012–2019)

Former
Rebecca White Berch, Chief Justice of the Arizona Supreme Court (2009–2014) (Republican)
John T. Broderick Jr., Chief Justice of the New Hampshire Supreme Court (1995–2004)
Janine P. Geske, associate justice of the Wisconsin Supreme Court (1993–1998) (Republican)
Robert C. Hunter, justice on the North Carolina Court of Appeals (1998–2014), North Carolina State Representative from District 49 (1980–1998)
Stacy Leeds, justice of the Cherokee Nation Supreme Court, Dean of the University of Arkansas School of Law (2011–2018)
Greg Mathis, judge of the District Court of the State of Michigan (1995–1998)
Robert F. Orr, justice of the North Carolina Supreme Court (1994–2004) (Republican)
Leo E. Strine Jr., Chief Justice of the Delaware Supreme Court (2014–2019)
Charles T. Wells, Chief Justice of the Supreme Court of Florida (2000–2002), member of the Supreme Court of Florida (1994–2009)

Municipal and local officials

Party officials

Party chairs

Donna Brazile, acting chair of the Democratic National Committee (2011, 2016–2017)
Maurice Mitchell, national director of the Working Families Party (2018–present) (Working Families Party)
Tom Perez, chair of the Democratic National Committee (2017–2021), U.S. Secretary of Labor (2013–2017), Assistant Attorney General for the Civil Rights Division (2013–2017)
David Wilhelm, chair of the Democratic National Committee (1993–1994)
Rosalind Wiener Wyman, chair of the 1984 Democratic National Convention, member of the Los Angeles City Council from District 5 (1953–1965)

Members of the DNC

Current

Lindy Li, Women's co-chair and Mid-Atlantic Regional Chair at the Democratic National Committee
Bob Mulholland, senior advisor for the California Democratic Party
Henry R. Muñoz III, finance chair of the Democratic National Committee (2017–2019)
Jason Rae, Secretary of the Democratic National Committee
James Roosevelt, attorney, grandson of President Franklin D. Roosevelt, co-chair of the Rules and Bylaws Committee of the Democratic National Committee (1995–present)
Symone Sanders, political commentator, national press secretary for the Bernie Sanders 2016 presidential campaign, senior advisor for the Joe Biden 2020 presidential campaign

Former
 
Steve Kerrigan, CEO of the DNC (2009–2012)
Hildy Kuryk, national finance director (2011–2013)
Jane Watson Stetson, national finance chair (2009–2013)
Andrew Tobias, treasurer of the DNC (1999–2017)

State and territory party chairs

Current

Cecil Benjamin, chair of the Democratic Party of the Virgin Islands
Nancy DiNardo, chair of the Connecticut Democratic Party (2020–present, 2005–2015)
Jane Kleeb, chair of the Nebraska Democratic Party (2016–present)
Felecia Rotellini, chair of the Arizona Democratic Party (2018–present)

Former
 
Paul Berendt, chair of the Washington State Democratic Party (1995–2006)
Matt Borges, chair of the Ohio Republican Party (2013–2017) (Republican)
Chip Forrester, chair of the Tennessee Democratic Party (2009–2013)
Jaime Harrison, 2020 nominee for Senate, chair of the South Carolina Democratic Party (2013–2017)
Wayne Holland, chair of the Utah Democratic Party (2005–2011), president of United Steelworkers District 12 (2019–present)
Jennifer Horn, chair of the New Hampshire Republican Party (2013–2017), co-founder of The Lincoln Project (Republican)
Bob Tuke, chair of the Tennessee Democratic Party (2005–2007)
David Young, chair of the North Carolina Democratic Party (2009–2011)
Pat Brady, chair of the Illinois Republican Party (2009–2013) (Republican)

Other 2020 candidates

Jake Auchincloss, 2020 nominee for Massachusetts's 4th congressional district
Jamaal Bowman, 2020 nominee for New York's 16th congressional district
Nancy Goroff, 2020 nominee for New York's 1st congressional district, chair of the chemistry department at Stony Brook University
Al Gross, Alaska 2020 nominee for Senate, orthopedic surgeon, former commercial fisherman
MJ Hegar, 2020 Texas nominee for Senate
Mondaire Jones, 2020 nominee for New York's 17th congressional district
Mark Kelly, Arizona 2020 nominee for Senate, former astronaut
Amy Kennedy, 2020 nominee for New Jersey's 2nd congressional district
Sri Preston Kulkarni, 2020 nominee for Texas's 22nd congressional district
Preston Love Jr., Nebraska 2020 write-in candidate for Senate
Kathy Manning, 2020 nominee for North Carolina's 6th congressional district
Amy McGrath, Kentucky 2020 nominee for Senate
Woody Myers, 2020 nominee for Governor of Indiana
Marie Newman, 2020 nominee for Illinois' 3rd congressional district
Jon Ossoff, Georgia 2020 nominee for Senate
Christopher Peterson, 2020 nominee for Governor of Utah, John J. Flynn Endowed Professor of Law at the University of Utah S.J. Quinney College of Law
Nikil Saval, Pennsylvania 2020 candidate for State Senate
Raphael Warnock, Georgia 2020 candidate for Senate, senior pastor of Ebenezer Baptist Church

International officials

Heads of state and government

Current

Mahmoud Abbas, President of the State of Palestine (2005–present) (Fatah)
Alberto Fernández, President of Argentina (2019–present) (Justicialist Party)
Zoran Milanović, President of Croatia (2020–present) (Independent)
Mohammad Shtayyeh, Prime Minister of the State of Palestine (2019–present) (Fatah)

Former

Carl Bildt, Prime Minister of Sweden (1991–1994) (Moderate Party)
Tony Blair, Prime Minister of the United Kingdom (1997–2007) (Labour Party)
Jim Bolger, Prime Minister of New Zealand (1990–1997) (New Zealand National Party)
Felipe Calderón, President of Mexico (2006–2012) (National Action Party)
David Cameron, Prime Minister of the United Kingdom (2010–2016) (Conservative Party)
Helen Clark, Prime Minister of New Zealand (1999–2008) (New Zealand Labour Party)
Rafael Correa, President of Ecuador (2007–2017) (Citizen Revolution Movement)
Mikuláš Dzurinda, Prime Minister of Slovakia (1998–2006), President of Slovakia (1998–1999) (Slovak Democratic and Christian Union – Democratic Party)
Laurent Fabius, Prime Minister of France (1984–1986) (Socialist Party)
José María Figueres, President of Costa Rica (1994–1998) (National Liberation Party)
Anders Fogh Rasmussen, Prime Minister of Denmark (2001–2009), Secretary General of NATO (2009–2014) (Venstre)
Vicente Fox, President of Mexico (2000–2006) (Independent)
Julia Gillard, Prime Minister of Australia (2010–2013) (Labor Party)
Ferenc Gyurcsány, Prime Minister of Hungary (2004–2009) (Democratic Coalition)
Ellen Johnson Sirleaf, President of Liberia (2006–2018) (Independent)
Albin Kurti, Prime Minister of Kosovo (2020) (Vetëvendosje)
Henry McLeish, First Minister of Scotland (2000–2001), Leader of the Scottish Labour Party (2000–2001) (Scottish Labour)
Mahathir Mohamad, Prime Minister of Malaysia (2018–2020, 1981–2003) (Homeland Fighters' Party)
Evo Morales, President of Bolivia (2006–2019) (Movement for Socialism)
Brian Mulroney, Prime Minister of Canada (1984–1993) (Conservative Party)
P. J. Patterson, Prime Minister of Jamaica (1992–2006) (People's National Party)
Petro Poroshenko, President of Ukraine (2014–2019) (European Solidarity)
Fredrik Reinfeldt, Prime Minister of Sweden (2006–2014) (Moderate Party)
Matteo Renzi, Prime Minister of Italy (2014–2016) (Italia Viva)
Kevin Rudd, Prime Minister of Australia (2007–2010, 2013) (Labor Party)
Malcolm Turnbull, Prime Minister of Australia (2015–2018) (Liberal Party)
Donald Tusk, President of the European Council (2014–2019), Prime Minister of Poland (2007–2014) (Civic Platform)
Leo Varadkar, Taoiseach of Ireland (2017–2020) (Fine Gael)

Other executive officials

Current
Jean Asselborn, Minister of Foreign Affairs of Luxembourg (2004–present), Deputy Prime Minister of Luxembourg (2004–2013)
Francesco Boccia, Italian Minister of Regional Affairs and Autonomies (2019–2021), member of the Italian Chamber of Deputies (2008–present) (Democratic Party)
Hilde Crevits, Vice Minister-President and Minister of Education of the Flemish Government (2014–present) (Christen-Democratisch en Vlaams)
Jan Hamáček, First Deputy Prime Minister of the Czech Republic (2018–present) (Czech Social Democratic Party)
Kamina Johnson-Smith, Ministry of Foreign Affairs and Foreign Trade of Jamaica (2016–present) (Labour Party)
Meryame Kitir, Minister of Development Cooperation and Urban Policy of Belgium (2020–present) (Socialistische Partij Anders)
Sammy Mahdi, Secretary of State for Asylum and Migration of Belgium (2020–present) (Christen-Democratisch en Vlaams)
Vincent Van Quickenborne, Minister of Justice and the North Sea of Belgium (2020–present) (Open Vlaamse Liberalen en Democraten)
Olaf Scholz, Federal Minister of Finance and Vice-Chancellor of Germany (2018–2021) (Social Democratic Party of Germany)
Petra De Sutter, Minister of Civil Service of Belgium (2020–present) (Groen)

Former
Simon Burns, Minister of State for Transport of the United Kingdom (2012–2013) (Conservative Party)
Alan Duncan, Minister of State for International Development of the United Kingdom (2010–2014) (Conservative Party)
Sigmar Gabriel, Vice-Chancellor of Germany (2013–2018) (Social Democratic Party of Germany)
William Hague, First Secretary of State of the United Kingdom (2010–2015), Leader of the House of Commons (2014–2015), Leader of the Conservative Party (1997–2001) (Conservative Party)
Sajid Javid, Secretary of State for Housing, Communities and Local Government of the United Kingdom (2016–2018), Home Secretary (2018–2019), Chancellor of the Exchequer (2019–2020) (Conservative Party)
Marina Kaljurand, Minister of Foreign Affairs for Estonia (2015–2016) (Social Democratic Party)
Luis Gilberto Murillo, Ministry of Environment and Sustainable Development of Colombia (2016–2018) (Radical Change)
Ana Palacio, Minister of Foreign Affairs of Spain (2002–2004) (People's Party)
Christopher Pyne, Minister for Defence of Australia (2018–2019) (Liberal Party)
Fahrudin Radončić, Minister of Security of Bosnia and Herzegovina (2012–2014, 2019–2020) (Union for a Better Future of BiH)

Legislative officials

Current
Markéta Adamová, member of the Chamber of Deputies of the Czech Republic (2013–present) (TOP 09)
Meyrem Almaci, member of the Belgian Chamber of Representatives (2007–present) (Groen)
Anna Ascani, member of the Italian Chamber of Deputies (2013–present) (Democratic Party)
Ivan Bartoš, member of the Chamber of deputies of the Czech Republic (2017–present) (Czech Pirate Party)
Alfredo Bazoli, member of the Italian Chamber of deputies (2013–present) (Democratic Party)
Caterina Biti, member of the Italian Senate (2018–present) (Democratic Party)
Georges-Louis Bouchez, member of the Belgian Senate (2019–present) (Mouvement Réformateur)
Nooshi Dadgostar, member of the Riksdag from Stockholm County (2014–present) (Left Party)
Ed Davey, Leader of the Liberal Democrats (2020–present), Member of Parliament of the United Kingdom for Kingston and Surbiton (1997–2015, 2017–present) (Liberal Democrats)
Pia Olsen Dyhr, member of the Danish Folketing (2006, 2007–present) (Socialist People's Party)
Jakob Ellemann-Jensen, member of the Danish Folketing (2011–present) (Venstre)
Davide Faraone, member of the Italian Senate (2019–present) (Italia Viva)
Stephen Farry, Member of Parliament of the United Kingdom for North Down (2019–present) (Alliance Party of Northern Ireland)
Valeria Fedeli, member of the Italian Senate (2013–present) (Democratic Party)
Maximiliano Ferraro, National Deputy for the City of Buenos Aires (2019–present) (Civic Coalition ARI)
Emanuele Fiano, member of the Italian Chamber of deputies (2006–present) (Democratic Party)
Dagmar Freitag, member of the German Bundestag (1994–present) (Social Democratic Party of Germany)
Peđa Grbin, member of the Croatian Parliament (2011–present) (Social Democratic Party of Croatia)
Gregor Gysi, member of the German Bundestag for Berlin-Treptow-Köpenick (2005–present) (The Left)
Marian Jurečka, member of the Chamber of deputies of the Czech Republic (2013–present) (KDU-ČSL)
Neil Kinnock, member of the House of Lords of the United Kingdom (2005–present), Leader of the Labour Party (1983–1992), Member of Parliament of the United Kingdom for Islwyn (1983–1995), MP for Bedwellty (1970–1983) (Labour Party)
Ulf Kristersson, member of the Riksdag (1994–2000, 2014–present) (Moderate Party)
Egbert Lachaert, member of the Belgian Chamber of Representatives (2014–present) (Open Vlaamse Liberalen en Democraten)
Alexander Graf Lambsdorff, member of the German Bundestag for North Rhine-Westphalia (2017–present) (Free Democratic Party)
Facundo Suárez Lastra, National Deputy of Argentina (2017–present) (Radical Civic Union)
Stefan Liebich, member of the German Bundestag for Berlin (2009–present) (The Left)
Annie Lööf, member of the Riksdag (2006–present) (Centre Party)
Luca Lotti, member of the Italian Chamber of Deputies (2013–present) (Democratic Party)
Andrea Marcucci, member of the Italian Senate (2008–present) (Democratic Party)
Salvatore Margiotta, member of the Italian Senate (2013–present) (Democratic Party)
Maurizio Martina, member of the Italian Chamber of deputies for Lombardy (2018–present) (Democratic Party)
John McGahon, Seanad Éireann (2020–present) (Fine Gael)
Erin McGreehan, Seanad Éireann (2020–present) (Fianna Fáil)
Katherine Miranda, member of the Chamber of Representatives of Colombia (2018–present) (Green Alliance)
Alessia Morani, member of the Italian Chamber of Deputies (2013–present) (Democratic Party)
Omid Nouripour, member of the German Bundestag for Hesse (2006–present) (Alliance 90/The Greens)
Dario Parrini, member of the Italian Senate (2018–present) (Democratic Party)
Gustavo Petro, Colombian Senator (2018–present, 2006–2010), Mayor of Bogota (2012–2015), 2010 and 2018 presidential nominee (Progressive Movement)
Adam Price, Leader of Plaid Cymru (2018–present), Member of the Senedd (2016–present) and MP (2001–2010) for Carmarthen East and Dinefwr (Plaid Cymru)
Lia Quartapelle, member of the Italian Chamber of Deputies (2013–present) (Democratic Party)
Vít Rakušan, member of the Chamber of Deputies of the Czech Republic (2017–present) (Mayors and Independents)
Neale Richmond, member of the Teachta Dála of Ireland (2020–present) (Fine Gael)
Gabriela Rivadeneira, member of the Ecuadorian National Assembly for the National Constituency (2013–present) (Citizen Revolution Movement)
Randolfe Rodrigues, Brazilian Senator for Amapá (2011–present) (Sustainability Network)
Ettore Rosato, member of the Italian Chamber of Deputies (2008–present) (Italia Viva)
Norbert Röttgen, member of the Bundestag for Rhein-Sieg-Kreis II of Germany (1994–present) (Christian Democratic Union)
Jagmeet Singh, Canadian member of parliament, party leader (New Democratic Party
Pernille Skipper, member of the Danish Folketing (2011–present) (Red–Green Alliance)
Jonas Gahr Støre, Member of the Norwegian Parliament (2009–present) (Labour Party)
Gabriele Toccafondi, member of the Italian Chamber of Deputies (2008–present) (Italia Viva)
Erkki Tuomioja, member of the Parliament of Finland (1970–1979, 1991–present) (Social Democratic Party of Finland)
Walter Verini, member of the Italian Chamber of Deputies (2008–present) (Democratic Party)
Louisa Wall, member of the New Zealand Parliament, (2008, 2011–present) (New Zealand Labour Party)

Former

Ricardo Anaya, president of the Mexican Chamber of Deputies (2013–2014), 2018 nominee for president (National Action Party)
Elisa Carrió, National Deputy for the City of Buenos Aires (2005–2007, 2009–2019) (Civic Coalition ARI)
Josephine Fock, member of the Danish Folketing (2015–2018) (The Alternative)
Antonello Giacomelli, member of the Italian Chamber of Deputies (2004–2020) (Democratic Party)
Boris Miletić, member of the Croatian Parliament (2008–2011, 2015–2018) (Istrian Democratic Assembly)
Leopoldo Martínez Nucete, deputy of the National Assembly of Venezuela (2000–2005)
Struan Stevenson, member of the European Parliament for Scotland (1999–2014) (Scottish Conservative)
Anne Tolley, Deputy Speaker of the New Zealand House of Representatives (2017–2020) (New Zealand National Party)

Academics and scholars

Andreas Acrivos, Albert Einstein Professor Emeritus of Science and Engineering at City College of New York
Peter Agre, physician, molecular biologist, Bloomberg Distinguished Professor at the Johns Hopkins Bloomberg School of Public Health and Johns Hopkins School of Medicine and recipient of the Nobel Prize in Chemistry in 2003
George Akerlof, economist, professor at the McCourt School of Public Policy at Georgetown University, professor of Economics Emeritus at the University of California, Berkeley and 2001 recipient of the Nobel Memorial Prize in Economics
Bruce Alberts, Chancellor's Leadership Chair in Biochemistry and Biophysics for Science and Education at the University of California, San Francisco, president of the National Academy of Sciences (1993–2005)
Parney Albright, physicist, weapons scientist and former director of the Lawrence Livermore National Laboratory
James P. Allison, immunologist, professor and chair of immunology and executive director of immunotherapy platform at the MD Anderson Cancer Center at the University of Texas and recipient of the Nobel Prize in Physiology or Medicine in 2018
Gar Alperovitz, historian, political economist, Lionel R. Bauman Professor of Political Economy at the University of Maryland, College Park
Sidney Altman, molecular biologist, Sterling Professor of Molecular, Cellular, and Developmental Biology and Chemistry at Yale University and recipient of the Nobel Prize in Chemistry in 1989
Bernard Amadei, professor of civil engineering at the University of Colorado Boulder, founder of Engineers without Borders USA
Frances Arnold, chemical engineer, Linus Pauling Professor of Chemical Engineering, Bioengineering and Biochemistry at California Institute of Technology and recipient of the Nobel Prize in Chemistry in 2018
Reza Aslan, Iranian-American scholar of religious studies, writer, television host
Myron Augsburger, theologian, former president of Eastern Mennonite University and the Council for Christian Colleges and Universities, pastor
Richard Axel, molecular biologist, professor in the Department of Neuroscience at Columbia University and recipient of the Nobel Prize in Physiology or Medicine in 2004
David Baltimore, biologist, professor of Biology and former president at California Institute of Technology and recipient of the Nobel Prize in Physiology or Medicine in 1975
Barry Barish, experimental physicist, professor of physics, emeritus, at the California Institute of Technology and recipient of the Nobel Prize in Physics in 2017
Paul Berg, biochemist and professor emeritus at Stanford University, recipient of the Nobel Prize in Chemistry in 1980
Joshua Berman, professor of Bible at Bar-Ilan University
J. Michael Bishop, immunologist, microbiologist, former chancellor of University of California, San Francisco and recipient of the Nobel Prize in Physiology or Medicine in 1989
Rachel Bitecofer, author, assistant director of the Wason Center for Public Policy at Christopher Newport University and senior fellow at the Niskanen Center
Elizabeth Blackburn, biologist, former president of the Salk Institute for Biological Studies and recipient of the Nobel Prize in Physiology or Medicine in 2009
Manuel Blum, former professor of computer science at University of California, Berkeley and Carnegie Mellon University
Philip Bobbitt, Herbert Wechsler Professor of Jurisprudence at Columbia Law School
Michael Stuart Brown, geneticist and recipient of the Nobel Prize in Physiology or Medicine in 1985
Linda B. Buck, biologist at Fred Hutchinson Cancer Research Center and recipient of the Nobel Prize in Physiology or Medicine in 2004
Diana Butler Bass, historian of Christianity, independent scholar, advocate for Progressive Christianity
Daniel Byman, Senior Associate Dean at the Georgetown University Walsh School of Foreign Service
Mario Capecchi, geneticist, distinguished professor of Human Genetics and Biology at the University of Utah School of Medicine and recipient of the Nobel Prize in Physiology or Medicine in 2007
Thomas Cech, chemist and recipient of the Nobel Prize in Chemistry in 1989
Vint Cerf, internet pioneer, former assistant professor at Stanford University
Martin Chalfie, neurobiologist, professor at Columbia University and recipient of the Nobel Prize in Chemistry in 2008
Aviva Chomsky, historian, professor of history and the coordinator of Latin American, Latino and Caribbean Studies at Salem State University
Noam Chomsky, linguist, Institute Professor Emeritus at the Massachusetts Institute of Technology
Kim Cobb, professor in the School of Earth and Atmospheric Sciences at the Georgia Institute of Technology
Marjorie Cohn, professor of law at the Thomas Jefferson School of Law, former president of the National Lawyers Guild
Elias James Corey, organic chemist and recipient of the Nobel Prize in Chemistry in 1990
Yi Cui, professor of materials science and engineering at Stanford University
John Dabiri, Centennial Chair Professor of Fluid Dynamics at the California Institute of Technology
Gretchen Daily, Bing Professor of Environmental Science at Stanford University
Ruth DeFries, environmental geographer and professor at Columbia University
Alan Dershowitz, lawyer and former Felix Frankfurter Professor of Law at Harvard Law School
Peter Diamond, economist, Institute Professor at the Massachusetts Institute of Technology, winner of the Nobel Memorial Prize in Economic Sciences in 2010
Whitfield Diffie, consulting scholar at Stanford University
Anne H. Ehrlich, associate director of the Center for Conservation Biology at Stanford University
Paul R. Ehrlich, Bing Professor of Population Studies at Stanford University
Ezekiel Emanuel, oncologist, bioethicist, senior fellow at the Center for American Progress and vice provost for global initiatives at the University of Pennsylvania
Ann Ferguson, philosopher, Professor Emerita of Philosophy and Women's Studies at the University of Massachusetts Amherst
Edmond H. Fischer, biochemist, recipient of the Nobel Prize in Physiology or Medicine in 1992
Joachim Frank, biophysicist at Columbia University and recipient of the Nobel Prize in Chemistry in 2017
Linda P. Fried, Dean of the Columbia University Mailman School of Public Health (2008–present)
Jerome Isaac Friedman, physicist, professor of physics, emeritus, at the Massachusetts Institute of Technology and recipient of the Nobel Prize in Physics in 1990
Walter Gilbert, biochemist, physicist, molecular biology pioneer and recipient of the Nobel Prize in Chemistry in 1980
Sheldon Glashow, theoretical physicist, Eugene Higgins Professor of Physics, Emeritus, at Harvard University and recipient of the Nobel Prize in Physics in 1979
Joseph L. Goldstein, biochemist and recipient of the Nobel Prize in Physiology or Medicine in 1985
Shafi Goldwasser, director of the Simons Institute for the Theory of Computing, former mathematical science professor at Weizmann Institute of Science and RSA professor at MIT
John B. Goodenough, materials scientist, a solid-state physicist and recipient of the Nobel Prize in Chemistry in 2019
Carol W. Greider, Daniel Nathans Professor and director of molecular biology and genetics at Johns Hopkins University and recipient of the Nobel Prize in Physiology or Medicine in 2009
David Gross, theoretical physicist, string theorist and recipient of the Nobel Prize in Physics in 2004
Andrej Grubačić, Yugoslav world-systems historian, professor and department chair of anthropology and social change at the California Institute of Integral Studies
Robin Hahnel, economist, professor of economics at Portland State University
Jeffrey C. Hall, geneticist, chronobiologist, professor Emeritus of Biology at Brandeis University and recipient of the Nobel Prize in Physiology or Medicine in 2017
John L. Hall, physicist and recipient of the Nobel Prize in Physics in 2005
Oliver Hart, economist, university professor at Harvard University, winner of the Nobel Memorial Prize in Economic Sciences in 2016
Leland H. Hartwell, geneticist, former president, and director of the Fred Hutchinson Cancer Research Center, and recipient of the Nobel Prize in Physiology or Medicine in 2001
Oona A. Hathaway, Gerard C. and Bernice Latrobe Smith Professor of International Law at Yale Law School
Alan J. Heeger, physicist, academic and recipient of the Nobel Prize in Chemistry in 2000
Dudley R. Herschbach, chemist at Harvard University and recipient of the Nobel Prize in Chemistry in 1986
Roald Hoffmann, Holocaust survivor, theoretical chemist, Frank H. T. Rhodes Professor of Humane Letters, Emeritus, at Cornell University and recipient of the Nobel Prize in Chemistry in 1981
H. Robert Horvitz, biologist and recipient of the Nobel Prize in Physiology or Medicine in 2002
Louis Ignarro, pharmacologist, professor emeritus of pharmacology at the UCLA School of Medicine's department of molecular and medical pharmacology and recipient of the Nobel Prize in Physiology or Medicine in 1998
William Kaelin Jr., physician-scientist, professor of medicine at Harvard University and the Dana–Farber Cancer Institute, and recipient of the Nobel Prize in Physiology or Medicine in 2019
Daniel Kammen, Distinguished Professor of Energy in the Energy and Resources Group at the University of California, Berkeley
Eric Kandel, medical doctor, neuroscientist, professor of biochemistry and biophysics at Columbia University and recipient of the Nobel Prize in Physiology or Medicine in 2000
Rebecca Katz, professor and director of the Center for Global Health Science and Security at Georgetown University Medical Center
Wolfgang Ketterle, physicist, professor of physics at the Massachusetts Institute of Technology and recipient of the Nobel Prize in Physics in 2001
Brian Kobilka, physiologist, professor in the department of Molecular and Cellular Physiology at Stanford University School of Medicine and recipient of the Nobel Prize in Chemistry in 2012
Roger D. Kornberg, biochemist, professor of structural biology at Stanford University and recipient of the Nobel Prize in Chemistry in 2006
J. Michael Kosterlitz, physicist, professor of physics at Brown University and recipient of the Nobel Prize in Physics in 2016
Herbert Kroemer, physicist, professor emeritus of electrical and computer engineering at the University of California, Santa Barbara and recipient of the Nobel Prize in Physics in 2000
Robert B. Laughlin, theoretical physicist, Anne T. and Robert M. Bass Professor of Physics and Applied Physics at Stanford University and recipient of the Nobel Prize in Physics in 1998
Yann LeCun, computer scientist and Silver Professor of the Courant Institute of Mathematical Sciences at New York University
Robert J. Lefkowitz, physician, biochemist, professor of biochemistry and chemistry at Duke University and recipient of the Nobel Prize in Chemistry in 2012
Anthony James Leggett, theoretical physicist. professor emeritus at the University of Illinois at Urbana-Champaign and recipient of the Nobel Prize in Physics in 2003
Samuel T. Logan, professor of church history at Biblical Theological Seminary, ecclesiastic historian, Presbyterian minister
Roderick MacKinnon, biophysicist, neuroscientist, professor of molecular neurobiology and biophysics at Rockefeller University and recipient of the Nobel Prize in Chemistry in 2003
Michael E. Mann, director of the Earth System Science Center at Pennsylvania State University
Eric Maskin, economist, Harvard University Professor, professor of economics and mathematics at Harvard University
John C. Mather, cosmologist, senior astrophysicist at the NASA Goddard Space Flight Center (GSFC) in Maryland and adjunct professor of physics at the University of Maryland College of Computer, Mathematical, and Natural Sciences and recipient of the Nobel Prize in Physics in 2006
Robert W. McChesney, Gutgsell Endowed Professor in the department of communication at the University of Illinois at Urbana–Champaign
Daniel McFadden, econometrician, recipient of the Nobel Memorial Prize in Economic Sciences in 2000, Presidential Professor of Health Economics at the University of Southern California, professor of the Graduate School at University of California, Berkeley
Bill McKibben, environmentalist, author, journalist, Schumann Distinguished Scholar at Middlebury College, leader of 350.org
Jon Meacham, writer, presidential biographer and Carolyn T. and Robert M. Rogers Endowed Chair in American Presidency at Vanderbilt University
Craig Mello, biologist, professor of molecular medicine at the University of Massachusetts Medical School and recipient of the Nobel Prize in Physiology or Medicine in 2006
Paul L. Modrich, biochemist, James B. Duke Professor of biochemistry at Duke University, investigator at the Howard Hughes Medical Institute and recipient of the Nobel Prize in Chemistry in 2015
William E. Moerner, physical chemist and chemical physicist and recipient of the Nobel Prize in Chemistry in 2014
Mario J. Molina, chemist, professor at the University of California, San Diego and recipient of the Nobel Prize in Chemistry in 1995
Richard Mouw, former president of the Fuller Theological Seminary, theologian, philosopher
Roger Myerson, economist, recipient of the Nobel Memorial Prize in Economic Sciences in 2007, David L. Pearson Distinguished Service Professor of Global Conflict Studies at the University of Chicago
Shuji Nakamura, electronic engineer, professor at the College of Engineering, University of California, Santa Barbara (UCSB)and recipient of the Nobel Prize in Physics in 2014
Jeremy Nathans, professor of molecular biology and genetics at Johns Hopkins University
Tom Nichols, professor of national security affairs at the U.S. Naval War College and Harvard Extension School
William Nordhaus, economist, recipient of the Nobel Memorial Prize in Economic Sciences in 2018, Sterling Professor of Economics at Yale University
John O'Keefe, neuroscientist, psychologist, professor at the Sainsbury Wellcome Centre for Neural Circuits and Behaviour and the Research Department of Cell and Developmental Biology at University College London, and recipient of the Nobel Prize in Physiology or Medicine in 2014
Paul Ortiz, historian, professor of history at the University of Florida, director of the Samuel Proctor Oral History Program
Douglas Osheroff, physicist, J. G. Jackson and C. J. Wood Professor of Physics, Emeritus at Stanford University and recipient of the Nobel Prize in Physics in 2012
Jim Peebles, astrophysicist, astronomer, theoretical cosmologist who is currently the Albert Einstein Professor of Science, Emeritus, at Princeton University and recipient of the Nobel Prize in Physics in 2019
Arno Allan Penzias, physicist, radio astronomer and recipient of the Nobel Prize in Physics in 1978
Saul Perlmutter, astrophysicist at the Lawrence Berkeley National Laboratory, professor of physics at the University of California, Berkeley and recipient of the Nobel Prize in Physics in 2011
Taylor G. Petrey, scholar of religion, former associate professor and research associate at Harvard Divinity School
Edmund Phelps, economist, recipient of the Nobel Memorial Prize in Economic Sciences, former McVickar Professor of Political Economy at Columbia University
Anthony B. Pinn, Agnes Cullen Arnold Professor of Humanities and Professor of Religious Studies at Rice University
Hugh David Politzer, theoretical physicist and recipient of the Nobel Prize in Physics in 2004
Paul Romer, economist, recipient of the Nobel Memorial Prize in Economic Sciences in 2018, former professor of economics at University of Chicago, University of California, Berkeley, Stanford Graduate School of Business, and University of Rochester, former World Bank Chief Economist (2016–2018)
Michael Rosbash, geneticist, chronobiologist, professor and researcher at Brandeis University, recipient of the Nobel Prize in Physiology or Medicine in 2017
James Rothman, biochemist, Fergus F. Wallace Professor of Biomedical Sciences at Yale University and recipient of the Nobel Prize in Physiology or Medicine in 2013
Joseph Sakran, assistant professor of surgery at the Johns Hopkins University
Barbara A. Schaal, professor of evolutionary biology, Dean of Arts and Sciences at Washington University (2013–present)
Randy Schekman, professor of cell biology at the University of California, Berkeley and recipient of the Nobel Prize in Physiology or Medicine in 2013
Brian Schmidt, astrophysicist, vice-chancellor of the Australian National University and recipient of the Nobel Prize in Physics in 2011
Juliet Schor, economist and Sociology Professor at Boston College
Richard R. Schrock, chemist and recipient of the Nobel Prize in Chemistry in 2005
Gregg L. Semenza, physician, professor of genetic medicine at the Johns Hopkins School of Medicine, and recipient of the Nobel Prize in Physiology or Medicine in 2019
Stephen Shalom, professor of political science at William Paterson University (Socialist Party of America)
Karl Barry Sharpless, chemist and recipient of the Nobel Prize in Chemistry in 2001
Drew Shindell, physicist and professor of climate science at Duke University
Ron Sider, theologian, Distinguished Professor of Theology, Holistic Ministry and Public Policy at the Palmer Theological Seminary of St. Davids, Pennsylvania, social activist
Hamilton O. Smith, microbiologist and recipient of the Nobel Prize in Physiology or Medicine in 1978
Kirk R. Smith, professor of Global Environmental Health at the University of California, Berkeley
Adam Sobel, professor of applied physics, applied mathematics, and earth sciences at Columbia University
Sean Solomon, William B. Ransford Professor of Earth and Planetary Science and director of the Lamont–Doherty Earth Observatory at Columbia University
Robert Solow, economist, Eremitus Institute Professor of economics at the Massachusetts Institute of Technology, recipient of the Nobel Memorial Prize in Economic Sciences in 1987
Alfred Sommer, ophthalmologist and epidemiologist at the Johns Hopkins Bloomberg School of Public Health
Michael Spence, economist, professor William R. Berkley Professor in Economics and Business at the Stern School of Business at New York University, Philip H. Knight Professor of Management, Emeritus, and dean at the Stanford Graduate School of Business, recipient of the Nobel Memorial Prize in Economic Sciences in 2001
Fraser Stoddart, chemist, Board of Trustees Professor of Chemistry and head of the Stoddart Mechanostereochemistry Group in the department of chemistry at Northwestern University and recipient of the Nobel Prize in Chemistry in 2016
Thomas C. Südhof, biochemist, professor at Stanford University and recipient of the Nobel Prize in Physiology or Medicine in 2013
Karel Svoboda, neuroscientist at Howard Hughes Medical Institute's Janelia Research Campus
Jack W. Szostak, biologist, professor of genetics at Harvard Medical School, Alexander Rich Distinguished Investigator at Massachusetts General Hospital, Boston, and recipient of the Nobel Prize in Physiology or Medicine in 2009
Joseph Hooton Taylor Jr. astrophysicist and recipient of the Nobel Prize in Physics in 1993
Richard Thaler, economist, Charles R. Walgreen Distinguished Service Professor of Behavioral Science and Economics at the University of Chicago Booth School of Business, recipient of the Nobel Memorial Prize in Economic Sciences in 2017
Kip Thorne, theoretical physicist and recipient of the Nobel Prize in Physics in 2017
Laurence Tribe, Carl M. Loeb University Professor at Harvard Law School
Susumu Tonegawa, molecular biologist, neuroscientist, and recipient of the Nobel Prize in Physiology or Medicine in 1987
Daniel C. Tsui, physicist, Arthur Legrand Doty Professor of Electrical Engineering, emeritus, at Princeton University and recipient of the Nobel Prize in Physics in 1998
Harold E. Varmus, biologist, former director of the National Institutes of Health, former director of the National Cancer Institute, Lewis Thomas University Professor of Medicine at Weill Cornell Medicine and recipient of the Nobel Prize in Physiology or Medicine in 1989
Burton Visotzky, scholar of Midrash, Appleman Professor of Midrash and Interreligious Studies at the Jewish Theological Seminary of America
Rainer Weiss, physicist, professor of physics, emeritus, at the Massachusetts Institute of Technology and recipient of the Nobel Prize in Physics in 2017
Cornel West, historian
Maureen White, senior fellow at the Foreign Policy Institute at Johns Hopkins School of Advanced International Studies
M. Stanley Whittingham, chemist, professor of chemistry, director of both the Institute for Materials Research and the Materials Science and Engineering program at Binghamton University and recipient of the Nobel Prize in Chemistry in 2019
Eric F. Wieschaus, evolutionary developmental biologist and recipient of the Nobel Prize in Physiology or Medicine in 1995
Torsten Wiesel, neurophysiologist and recipient of the Nobel Prize in Physiology or Medicine in 1981
Frank Wilczek, theoretical physicist, mathematician, Herman Feshbach Professor of Physics at the Massachusetts Institute of Technology (MIT), and recipient of the Nobel Prize in Physics in 2004
Robert Woodrow Wilson, astronomer and recipient of the Nobel Prize in Physics in 1978
David J. Wineland, physicist at the National Institute of Standards and Technology and recipient of the Nobel Prize in Physics in 2012
Michael W. Young, biologist, geneticist, and recipient of the Nobel Prize in Physiology or Medicine in 2017

Activists and public figures

Clay Aiken, Democratic candidate for NC-02 in 2014, singer, television personality, actor, activist
Michael Albert, economist, speaker, writer, political critic
Valerie Alexander, speaker, writer for The Huffington Post
Aimee Allison, founder and president of She the People
Debbie Almontaser, schoolteacher, Yemeni activist, founder of the Khalil Gibran International Academy
Clayton Anderson, retired NASA astronaut, author, motivational speaker
Bob Avakian, chairman of the Revolutionary Communist Party, USA (Revolutionary Communist)
Michael Avenatti, former attorney to Stormy Daniels, convicted felon
Ady Barkan, activist, attorney
Lisa Blue Baron, trial lawyer
David Barsamian, Armenian-American radio broadcaster, writer, founder and director of Alternative Radio
Ryan J. Bell, atheist, former Seventh-day Adventist Pastor, contributor to HuffPost
Medea Benjamin, political activist, co-founder of Code Pink
Ruthie Berman, LGBT rights activists
Megan Beyer, journalist, activist, advocate of women's rights and gender issues, former Second Lady of Virginia (1990–1998)
Ashley Biden, Biden's daughter, social worker, activist, philanthropist, fashion designer
Jill Biden, Second Lady of the United States (2009–2017), Biden's wife, educator
Richard Bloomingdale, president of the Pennsylvania AFL–CIO (2010–present)
Max Boot, author, consultant, military historian, columnist for The Washington Post (Republican before 2016, now independent)
Keith Boykin, progressive broadcaster, political commentator for CNN
Greg Boyle, Roman Catholic priest of the Jesuit order, founder and director of Homeboy Industries
Ruby Bridges, civil rights activist and the first African-American child to desegregate the all-white William Frantz Elementary School in Louisiana during the New Orleans school desegregation crisis
Sharon Brous, senior rabbi at IKAR
Amy Butler, Christian minister, former senior minister at the Riverside Church
Leslie Cagan, activist, writer, socialist organizer
Simone Campbell, Roman Catholic Religious Sister, lawyer, executive director of NETWORK
Amanda Carpenter, author, political advisor, speechwriter (Republican)
Gwen Carr, activist, public speaker, author, mother of police brutality victim Eric Garner
Rosalynn Carter, First Lady of the United States (1977–1981) and First Lady of Georgia (1971–1975)
James Carville, Democratic political consultant
Mona Charen, columnist, journalist, political commentator, writer (Republican)
Niki Christoff, economic policy advisor, campaign operative (Republican)
Connie Chung, journalist, reporter, former evening news anchor
Shane Claiborne, Christian activist, author
Charlotte Clymer, LGBTQ+ activist, writer for The Washington Post
Jeff Cohen, journalist, co-founder of RootsAction.org
Michael Cohen, disbarred lawyer, former attorney of Donald Trump (Former Republican, later Democratic)
George Conway, attorney, co-founder of The Lincoln Project (Republican before 2018, now Independent)
Claudia Conway, liberal activist, daughter of Kellyanne Conway and George Conway
Christian Cooper, LGBTQ+ activist, comic book writer, birder
Phil Coorey, Australian journalist, political editor for The Australian Financial Review
Benjamin Crump, civil rights lawyer
Alphonso David, LGBTQ+ activist president of Human Rights Campaign (2019–present)
Susan Del Percio, political strategist, media analyst (Republican)
Anthony Diekema, former president of Calvin University
TJ Ducklo, political aide, media strategist
Chaz Ebert, attorney, businesswoman
Douglas Emhoff, entertainment lawyer, Harris's husband
Adam C. Engst, publisher of TidBITS
Greg Epstein, Humanist Rabbi, Chaplain at Harvard University and Massachusetts Institute of Technology
Liza Featherstone, journalist, writer for The Nation and Jacobin
Karen Finney, political commentator for CNN, spokesperson for the Hillary Clinton 2016 presidential campaign
Mary Fisher, HIV/AIDS activist
Abraham Foxman, lawyer, Holocaust survivor, national director of the Anti-Defamation League (1987–2015)
Roxane Gay, writer, professor, editor
Helene D. Gayle, doctor, CEO of the Chicago Community Trust
Menachem Genack, Orthodox rabbi, CEO of the Orthodox Union Kosher Division
Joseph Gerson, peace and disarmament activist
Jeffrey Goldberg, journalist and editor-in-chief of The Atlantic magazine
X González, gun control activist, co-founder of Never Again MSD
Linda Gordon, feminist, historian
Suzanne Gordon, journalist, author
Chad Griffin, founder of American Foundation for Equal Rights, President of Human Rights Campaign (2012–2019)
Rhiana Gunn-Wright, Climate Policy Director at the Roosevelt Institute, co-author of the Green New Deal
Bruce Guthrie, Australian journalist
Fred Guttenberg, gun control activist, father of Stoneman Douglas High School shooting victim Jaime Guttenberg
Eugene Gu, former resident physician, social media personality (previously endorsed Andrew Yang)
Maya Harris, lawyer, public policy advocate, television commentator, Harris' sister
Meena Harris, lawyer, children's book author, founder of the Phenomenal Woman Action Campaign, Harris' niece
Jill Hazelbaker, communications director for the 2008 McCain presidential campaign (Republican)
Mary Kay Henry, labor leader, international president of SEIU
Doug Henwood, journalist, economic analyst, author, financial trader
Katrina vanden Heuvel, publisher, part-owner, and former editor of The Nation
Anita Hill, lawyer, professor, accused Clarence Thomas of sexual harassment in 1991
David Hogg, gun control activist, student who survived the Stoneman Douglas High School shooting
Ilyse Hogue, progressive activist, president of NARAL Pro-Choice America
Jared Hohlt, writer, editor of Slate
Dolores Huerta, labor leader, civil rights activist, co-founder of United Farm Workers
Coleman Hughes, writer, opinion columnist
Joel Hunter, former senior pastor of Northland Church
John Ibbitson, Canadian journalist, columnist for The Globe and Mail
Ben Jealous, civil rights leader, president of People for the American Way (2020–present)
Karine Jean-Pierre, political campaign organizer, activist, political commentator, lecturer in international and public affairs at Columbia University
Miriam Jerris, rabbi of the Society for Humanistic Judaism
Alexis McGill Johnson, president and CEO of Planned Parenthood (2020–present)
Derrick Johnson, lawyer, current CEO of the NAACP (2017–present)
Molly Jong-Fast, author, liberal political commentator, editor-at-large at The Daily Beast
Fred Kaplan, author, journalist, writer of the "War Stories" column for Slate
Cameron Kasky, activist, gun control activist, co-founder of Never Again MSD (previously endorsed Andrew Yang)
Valarie Kaur, activist, documentary filmmaker, lawyer, educator and faith leader
Joshua Keating, foreign policy analyst, staff writer and author of the World blog at Slate
Mara Keisling, founding executive director of the National Center for Transgender Equality
Kathy Kelly, peace activist, pacifist, author
Kate Kendell, former executive director of the National Center for Lesbian Rights
Ibram X. Kendi, author, historian, activist, professor
Victoria Reggie Kennedy, attorney, widow of former senator Ted Kennedy
Khizr Khan, father of deceased U.S. Army Captain Humayun Khan
Brian Klaas, political scientist, columnist for The Washington Post
Sharon Kleinbaum, rabbi, spiritual leader of New York City's Congregation Beit Simchat Torah
Jeff Klepper, cantor, Contemporary Jewish religious music influencer
Howard Krein, Biden's son-in-law, otolaryngologist, plastic surgeon, business executive
María Teresa Kumar, Colombian American political rights activist, president and CEO of Voto Latino
Dan La Botz, labor union activist, academic, journalist, author (Socialist Party USA)
Joy Ladin, poet and the David and Ruth Gottesman Chair in English at Stern College for Women at Yeshiva University
Khalid Latif, imam
James Lawson, activist in the Civil Rights Movement, pastor, professor
Lilly Ledbetter, equal pay for equal work activist, lead plaintiff in the landmark employment discrimination Supreme Court case, Ledbetter v. Goodyear Tire & Rubber Co., namesake of the Lilly Ledbetter Fair Pay Act of 2009
Robert W. Lee IV, activist, former pastor, descendant of Robert E. Lee
Rodrigo Lehtinen, Cuban-American LGBT rights advocate
Josh Levin, writer, executive editor at Slate
Sarah Longwell, publisher of The Bulwark, former board chair of the Log Cabin Republicans (Republican)
John R. MacArthur, journalist, president of Harper's Magazine
Ben Mathis-Lilley, journalist, chief news blogger of Slate'''s news section Slatest
Cindy McCain, businesswoman, philanthropist, humanitarian, widow of late Senator John McCain (Republican)Steve McIntosh, author, lawyer, entrepreneur
Vashti Murphy McKenzie, Bishop of the African Methodist Episcopal Church
Evan McMullin, activist, former CIA officer, 2016 independent candidate for President (Independent)Michael Medved, radio show host
Mike Mignola, comics artist, writer
Stuart Milk, LGBT rights activist, political speaker, nephew of civil rights leader Harvey Milk
Laura Miller, journalist, critic, Books and Culture columnist at SlateDale Minami, lawyer, represented Fred Korematsu in Korematsu v. United StatesShannon Minter, civil rights attorney, legal director of the National Center for Lesbian Rights
Jack Moline, Conservative rabbi, executive director of Interfaith Alliance
Michael Mulgrew, president of the United Federation of Teachers (2009–present)
Mike Murphy, political consultant, strategist (Republican)Tammy Murphy, First Lady of New Jersey (2018–present)
William Murphy, former Bishop of the Roman Catholic Diocese of Rockville Centre
Ana Navarro, political commentator, strategist (Republican)Bill Nye, science communicator, television presenter, and mechanical engineer
Michelle Obama, activist, First Lady of the United States (2009–2017)
Jim Obergefell, lead plaintiff in landmark civil rights Supreme Court case Obergefell v. HodgesJen O'Malley Dillon, political strategist, campaign manager for the Joe Biden 2020 presidential campaign, campaign manager for the Beto O'Rourke 2020 presidential campaign
Howard Opinsky, national press secretary of the 2000 McCain presidential campaign (Republican)Doug Pagitt, progressive evangelical pastor, author
Claudia Palacios, Colombian journalist, former news anchor for CNN en Español
John M. Perkins, Christian minister, civil rights activist, Bible teacher, best-selling author, philosopher, community developer
Mike Pesca, radio journalist, host of Slate’s podcast The GistAlexandra Petri, humorist, columnist for The Washington PostMegan Phelps-Roper, former member and spokesperson of the Westboro Baptist Church
Leonard Pitts, commentator, journalist, and novelist
Abigail Pogrebin, writer, journalist, podcast host for Tablet magazine, former director of Jewish Outreach for the Michael Bloomberg 2020 presidential campaign
Katha Pollitt, post, essayist, critic
Dan Rather, journalist, former national evening news anchor
Irwin Redlener, pediatrician, public health activist
Cecile Richards, former president of Planned Parenthood
Laura Ricketts, former attorney, first openly gay owner of a major-league sports franchise
Gene Robinson, former bishop of the Episcopal Diocese of New Hampshire
Julie Chavez Rodriguez, political rights activist, designated director of the White House Office of Intergovernmental Affairs for Biden
Joanne Rogers, widow of Fred Rogers
Shmuel Rosner, Israeli columnist, editor, researcher
Jonathan Rotenberg, executive coach, co-founder of the Boston Computer Society
Jennifer Rubin, journalist, columnist for The Washington Post (Independent)Faiza Saeed, attorney, partner at Cravath, Swaine & Moore
Bamby Salcedo, founder of TransLatina Coalition
William Saletan, writer and national correspondent at SlateMark Salter, speechwriter of the 2008 McCain presidential campaign (Republican)David Sanford, civil rights attorney
Lydia Sargent, feminist, writer, author, playwright, actor
Harut Sassounian, Armenian-American writer, public activist, publisher of The California CourierReshma Saujani, lawyer, founder of Girls Who Code
Andrea Saul, press secretary of the 2012 Romney presidential campaign (Republican)Rob Schenck, Evangelical clergyman, president of the Dietrich Bonhoeffer Institute
Jack Schlossberg, grandson of former president John F. Kennedy
Steve Schmidt, chief strategist for the John McCain 2008 presidential campaign, co-founder of The Lincoln Project (Republican before 2018, now Democrat)Stephen F. Schneck, Catholic activist, executive director of Franciscan Action Network
Stephanie Schriock, political strategist and president of EMILY's List
Stuart Schuffman, contemporary travel writer, blogger
Connie Schultz, writer, journalist, wife of Senator Sherrod Brown
Jacques Servin, leading member of The Yes Men
Tara Setmayer, CNN political commentator, contributor to ABC News (Republican)Fawn Sharp, politician, attorney, president of the National Congress of American Indians (since 2019)
Al Sharpton, civil rights activist, Baptist minister, talk show host
Dennis Shepard, father of Matthew Shepard, co-founder of the Matthew Shepard Foundation, LGBTQ+ activist
Judy Shepard, mother of Matthew Shepard, co-founder of the Matthew Shepard Foundation, LGBTQ+ activist
Maria Shriver, journalist, author, First Lady of California (2003–2011) (Independent)Timothy Shriver, chairman of the Special Olympics, disability rights activist, film producer, member of the Kennedy family
Ron Sider, theologian, social activist and founder of Evangelicals for Social Action
Simran Jeet Singh, educator, writer and activist
Marina Sitrin, writer, professor, lawyer, activist
Norman Solomon, journalist, activist, co-founder of RootsAction.org
Mohamed Soltan, Egyptian-American human rights advocate, former political prisoner in Egypt
Andy Spahn, political activist, consultant
Roy Speckhardt, executive director of the American Humanist Association, author
Richard B. Spencer, neo-Nazi, antisemitic conspiracy theorist, white supremacist (endorsement rejected by Biden)Andrea Dew Steele, co-founder of Emerge California
Bret Stephens, recipient of the Pulitzer Prize, conservative journalist, editor, columnist
Stuart Stevens, writer and senior political strategist for Mitt Romney's 2012 presidential campaign (Republican)Tom Steyer, hedge fund manager, liberal activist, philanthropist, 2020 candidate for president
Mac Stipanovich, political activist, strategist
Sully Sullenberger, former U.S. Air Force captain and commercial airline pilot during the water landing of US Airways Flight 1549
Charlie Sykes, conservative talk show radio host, founder of The Bulwark (Republican)Greta Thunberg, Swedish environmental activist and de facto leader of the school strike for climate movement
Richard Trumka, president of the AFL–CIO (2009–present), president of the United Mine Workers (1982–1995)
Mary L. Trump, psychologist, businessperson, author, niece of Donald Trump
Cristina Tzintzún Ramirez, labor organizer, writer
Cenk Uygur, liberal political commentator, media host, journalist
Alexandria Villaseñor, climate activist, co-founder of US Youth Climate Strike
Christie Vilsack, First Lady of Iowa (1999–2007), 2012 nominee for IA-04
Ou Virak, Cambodian human rights activist, public intellect
Suzyn Waldman, sportscaster
Dane Waters, campaign strategist (Republican)Mikal Watts, attorney
Jeff Weaver, president of Our Revolution (2016–2017), campaign manager for the Bernie Sanders 2016 presidential campaign, advisor to the Bernie Sanders 2020 presidential campaign
John Weaver, political consultant, chief strategist for the John Kasich 2016 presidential campaign, co-founder of The Lincoln Project (Republican)Peter Wehner, writer for The New York Times, former speechwriter (Republican)Randi Weingarten, president of the American Federation of Teachers (2008–present), President of the United Federation of Teachers (1998–2008), labor leader, attorney, educator
Perry Weitz, attorney, partner at Weitz & Luxenberg P.C.
George Will, journalist, columnist for The Washington Post (Formerly Republican, now Independent since 2016)John Eddie Williams, pharmaceutical injury and mass tort attorney
Gregory Wilpert, German activist, founder of Venezuelanalysis.com
Nancy Wilson, cleric, former moderator of the Universal Fellowship of Metropolitan Community Churches
Rick Wilson, political strategist, media consultant, author, co-founder of The Lincoln Project (Former Republican, now Independent since 2019)Jonathan Wilson-Hartgrove, writer, Baptist preacher
Mark Winer, interfaith activist, rabbi
Evan Wolfson, attorney, gay rights activist, founder and president of Freedom to Marry
Eric Yoffie, rabbi, president of the Union for Reform Judaism (1996–2012)
Rick Zbur, executive director of Equality California
James Zogby, founder and president of the Arab American Institute
Marc Zwillinger, founder and managing member of the privacy and information security law firm ZwillGen

Business executives and leaders

Joyce Aboussie, founder and CEO of Aboussie & Associates and Telephone Contact Inc.
S. Daniel Abraham, investor, philanthropist and founder of Thompson Medical
Michael Alter, president and owner of the Alter Group
Ashok Amritraj, chairman and CEO of the Hyde Park Entertainment Group
José Andrés, chef and founder of World Central Kitchen
Mark Arabo, Chaldean-American businessman
Amy Banse, managing director and head of funds for Comcast Ventures, senior vice president of Comcast, member of the board of directors at Adobe Systems and Clorox
Robert Bass Texas Billionaire Investor 
Arthur Blank, co-founder of The Home Depot
David Bonderman, billionaire, founding partner of TPG Capital and Newbridge Capital
Lisa Brummel, co-owner of the Seattle Storm
Sandy Carter, vice president at Amazon Web Services
Edwin Catmull, co-founder of Pixar, former president of Walt Disney Animation Studios, computer scientist
Peter Chernin, chairman and CEO of the Chernin Group
David L. Cohen, senior executive vice-president and chief lobbyist for Comcast
Mark Cuban, investor and owner of the Dallas Mavericks (Independent)Leslee Dart, founder and co-CEO of 42West
Morgan DeBaun, founder and CEO of Blavity Inc.
Michael De Luca, chairman of MGM Studios
Barry Diller, chairman and senior executive of IAC/InterActiveCorp and Expedia Group, founder of Fox Broadcasting Company and USA Broadcasting
Jamie Dinan, investor, hedge fund manager, philanthropist
Kevin Feige, president of Marvel Studios
Carly Fiorina, chair (2000–2005), president and CEO (1999–2005) of Hewlett-Packard, 2016 candidate for president, California 2010 nominee for Senate (Republican)Rob Friedman, media executive
Nely Galán, former president of entertainment for Telemundo
Mark Gallogly, managing principal and founder of Centerbridge Partners
Jim Gianopulos, CEO of Paramount Pictures
L. Felice Gorordo, entrepreneur and CEO of eMerge AmericasJulia S. Gouw, former president and COO of East West Bank
Peter Guber, chairman and CEO of Mandalay Entertainment
Reed Hastings, co-founder, chairman, and co-chief executive officer (CEO) of Netflix
John L. Hennessy, computer scientist and chair of Alphabet Inc.
Mellody Hobson, president and co-CEO of Ariel Investments
Reid Hoffman, co-founder and former executive chairman of LinkedIn
Lisa Hook, former president of CEO of Neustar
Alan F. Horn, co-chairman of Walt Disney Studios
Bob Iger, executive chairman of The Walt Disney Company
Laurene Powell Jobs, billionaire heiress, businesswoman, executive and founder of the Emerson Collective
Jeffrey Katzenberg, co-founder and CEO of DreamWorks Animation and DreamWorks Records, (previously endorsed Steve Bullock)Donna Langley, chairwoman of Universal Pictures
Sherry Lansing, former CEO of Paramount Pictures
Marc Lasry, billionaire, hedge fund manager, co-founder and CEO of Avenue Capital Group, co-owner of the Milwaukee Bucks
Keith Leaphart, entrepreneur, philanthropist and physician
Aileen Lee, founder of Cowboy Ventures
Kevin Liles, record executive and co-founder and CEO of 300 Entertainment
Bryan Lourd, partner, managing director and co-chairman of Creative Artists Agency
Li Lu, founder and chairman of Himalaya Capital Management
Daniel Lubetzky, founder and executive chairman of Kind
Larry Lucchino, former CEO of the Boston Red Sox
Christina Weiss Lurie, part owner of the Philadelphia Eagles
Jacqueline Mars, heiress to Mars, Inc and investor
David Morehouse, CEO and president of the Pittsburgh Penguins
James Murdoch, former CEO of 21st Century Fox
Dominic Ng, chairman, president and CEO of East West Bank
Indra Nooyi, former chairman and CEO of PepsiCo
Jorge M. Pérez, chairman and CEO of The Related Group, real estate developer, art collector, and philanthropist
Kathryn Petralia, co-founder and COO of Kabbage
John Pritzker, billionaire and investor
M. R. Rangaswami, Indian software executive
Douglas Rediker, founder and chairman of International Capital Strategies, LLC
Joyce Rey, luxury real estate agent, head of the Global Luxury division for Coldwell Banker
Joseph L. Rice III, co-founder of Clayton, Dubilier & Rice
Katie Rodan, dermatologist, entrepreneur and author
John W. Rogers Jr., investor, philanthropist founder of Ariel Investments
Art Rooney II, owner of the Pittsburgh Steelers
Angelica Ross, businesswoman, founder and CEO of TransTech Social Enterprises
Tom Rothman, chairman of Sony Pictures Motion Picture Group
Haim Saban, Israeli-American media proprietor, investor, and producer of records, film, and television
Howard Schultz, former CEO of Starbucks
Mark Schuster, dean and CEO of the Kaiser Permanente Bernard J. Tyson School of Medicine
Jon Shirley, former president, chief operating officer, and director of Microsoft
David A. Siegel, founder of Westgate Resorts
Herbert Simon, real estate developer, owner of the Indiana Pacers
Nat Simons, hedge fund manager, billionaire, philanthropist
Michael Peter Skelly, renewable energy and infrastructure developer and entrepreneur
Harry E. Sloan, director of ZeniMax Media
Brad Smith, president of Microsoft
Chip Smith, executive vice president of Public Affairs at 21st Century Fox
Jay T. Snyder, philanthropist
Jonathan Soros, founder and chief executive officer of JS Capital Management LLC
Bill Stetson, businessman
Arn Tellem, vice chairman of the Detroit Pistons
Jonathan Tisch, chairman emeritus of the United States Travel Association, board member of the Tribeca Film Institute and co-owner of the New York Giants
Glen Tullman, former CEO of Allscripts
Jon F. Vein, co-founder and former co-Chief of MarketShare
Dana Walden, chairman of entertainment at Walt Disney Television
Tom Werner, chairman of the Boston Red Sox
Meg Whitman, CEO of Quibi, CEO of Hewlett Packard Enterprise (2011–2018), CEO of eBay (1998–2008), 2010 nominee for Governor of California (Republican)Zygi Wilf, billionaire, co-owner of the Minnesota Vikings
Whitney Williams, businesswoman
Anna Wintour, journalist, editor-in-chief of Vogue''
Anne Wojcicki, co-founder and CEO of 23andMe
Robert Wolf, chairman and CEO of UBS Americas
Andrew Yang, Presidential Ambassador for Global Entrepreneurship (2015–17), founder of Venture for America, 2020 candidate for president
Kneeland Youngblood, co-founder of private equity firm Pharos Capital Group, LLC
Kinney Zalesne, general manager for corporate strategy at Microsoft
Peng Zhao, CEO of Citadel LLC
Jeremy Zimmer, CEO of United Talent Agency

Entertainment and sports personalities

Organizations

See also
Endorsements in the 2020 Democratic Party presidential primaries
News media endorsements in the 2020 United States presidential primaries
News media endorsements in the 2020 United States presidential election
List of Donald Trump 2020 presidential campaign political endorsements
List of Donald Trump 2020 presidential campaign non-political endorsements
List of former Trump administration officials who endorsed Joe Biden
List of Jo Jorgensen 2020 presidential campaign endorsements
List of Howie Hawkins 2020 presidential campaign endorsements
List of Republicans who opposed the Donald Trump 2020 presidential campaign

Notes

References

External links